

9001–9100 

|-bgcolor=#fefefe
| 9001 Slettebak ||  ||  || August 30, 1981 || Anderson Mesa || E. Bowell || — || align=right | 3.8 km || 
|-id=002 bgcolor=#E9E9E9
| 9002 Gabrynowicz ||  ||  || August 23, 1981 || La Silla || H. Debehogne || — || align=right | 5.4 km || 
|-id=003 bgcolor=#E9E9E9
| 9003 Ralphmilliken ||  ||  || October 24, 1981 || Palomar || S. J. Bus || HOF || align=right | 15 km || 
|-id=004 bgcolor=#d6d6d6
| 9004 Peekaydee ||  ||  || October 22, 1982 || Kitt Peak || G. Aldering || ALA || align=right | 14 km || 
|-id=005 bgcolor=#E9E9E9
| 9005 Sidorova ||  ||  || October 20, 1982 || Nauchnij || L. G. Karachkina || — || align=right | 12 km || 
|-id=006 bgcolor=#E9E9E9
| 9006 Voytkevych ||  ||  || October 21, 1982 || Nauchnij || L. G. Karachkina || EUN || align=right | 7.6 km || 
|-id=007 bgcolor=#fefefe
| 9007 James Bond ||  ||  || October 5, 1983 || Kleť || A. Mrkos || 007 || align=right | 3.7 km || 
|-id=008 bgcolor=#fefefe
| 9008 Bohšternberk || 1984 BS ||  || January 27, 1984 || Kleť || A. Mrkos || — || align=right | 4.5 km || 
|-id=009 bgcolor=#fefefe
| 9009 Tirso ||  ||  || April 23, 1984 || La Silla || V. Zappalà || — || align=right | 3.5 km || 
|-id=010 bgcolor=#fefefe
| 9010 Candelo ||  ||  || April 27, 1984 || La Silla || V. Zappalà || — || align=right | 5.0 km || 
|-id=011 bgcolor=#fefefe
| 9011 Angelou || 1984 SU ||  || September 20, 1984 || Kleť || A. Mrkos || — || align=right | 3.7 km || 
|-id=012 bgcolor=#d6d6d6
| 9012 Benner || 1984 UW ||  || October 26, 1984 || Anderson Mesa || E. Bowell || — || align=right | 11 km || 
|-id=013 bgcolor=#E9E9E9
| 9013 Sansaturio ||  ||  || August 14, 1985 || Anderson Mesa || E. Bowell || — || align=right | 4.3 km || 
|-id=014 bgcolor=#fefefe
| 9014 Svyatorichter ||  ||  || October 22, 1985 || Nauchnij || L. V. Zhuravleva || — || align=right | 3.8 km || 
|-id=015 bgcolor=#E9E9E9
| 9015 Coe || 1985 VK ||  || November 14, 1985 || Brorfelde || P. Jensen || — || align=right | 17 km || 
|-id=016 bgcolor=#E9E9E9
| 9016 Henrymoore || 1986 AE ||  || January 10, 1986 || Palomar || C. S. Shoemaker, E. M. Shoemaker || — || align=right | 8.2 km || 
|-id=017 bgcolor=#E9E9E9
| 9017 Babadzhanyan ||  ||  || October 2, 1986 || Nauchnij || L. V. Zhuravleva || RAF || align=right | 4.5 km || 
|-id=018 bgcolor=#fefefe
| 9018 Galache || 1987 JG ||  || May 5, 1987 || Lake Tekapo || A. C. Gilmore, P. M. Kilmartin || V || align=right | 3.2 km || 
|-id=019 bgcolor=#fefefe
| 9019 Eucommia ||  ||  || August 28, 1987 || La Silla || E. W. Elst || — || align=right | 5.1 km || 
|-id=020 bgcolor=#E9E9E9
| 9020 Eucryphia ||  ||  || September 19, 1987 || Smolyan || E. W. Elst || — || align=right | 5.0 km || 
|-id=021 bgcolor=#E9E9E9
| 9021 Fagus ||  ||  || February 14, 1988 || La Silla || E. W. Elst || EUN || align=right | 13 km || 
|-id=022 bgcolor=#d6d6d6
| 9022 Drake ||  ||  || August 14, 1988 || Palomar || C. S. Shoemaker, E. M. Shoemaker || — || align=right | 7.0 km || 
|-id=023 bgcolor=#C2FFFF
| 9023 Mnesthus ||  ||  || September 10, 1988 || Palomar || C. S. Shoemaker, E. M. Shoemaker || L5 || align=right | 49 km || 
|-id=024 bgcolor=#fefefe
| 9024 Gunnargraps ||  ||  || September 5, 1988 || La Silla || H. Debehogne || — || align=right | 2.6 km || 
|-id=025 bgcolor=#d6d6d6
| 9025 Polanskey ||  ||  || September 16, 1988 || Cerro Tololo || S. J. Bus || THM || align=right | 9.1 km || 
|-id=026 bgcolor=#d6d6d6
| 9026 Denevi ||  ||  || September 16, 1988 || Cerro Tololo || S. J. Bus || THM || align=right | 11 km || 
|-id=027 bgcolor=#fefefe
| 9027 Graps ||  ||  || November 4, 1988 || Kleť || A. Mrkos || — || align=right | 3.1 km || 
|-id=028 bgcolor=#fefefe
| 9028 Konrádbeneš ||  ||  || January 26, 1989 || Kleť || A. Mrkos || NYS || align=right | 11 km || 
|-id=029 bgcolor=#E9E9E9
| 9029 || 1989 GM || — || April 6, 1989 || Palomar || E. F. Helin || GER || align=right | 5.3 km || 
|-id=030 bgcolor=#C2FFFF
| 9030 Othryoneus ||  ||  || October 30, 1989 || Cerro Tololo || S. J. Bus || L5 || align=right | 32 km || 
|-id=031 bgcolor=#fefefe
| 9031 ||  || — || November 29, 1989 || Kleť || A. Mrkos || — || align=right | 3.1 km || 
|-id=032 bgcolor=#fefefe
| 9032 Tanakami ||  ||  || November 23, 1989 || Geisei || T. Seki || FLO || align=right | 3.2 km || 
|-id=033 bgcolor=#d6d6d6
| 9033 Kawane || 1990 AD ||  || January 4, 1990 || Susono || M. Akiyama, T. Furuta || MEL || align=right | 16 km || 
|-id=034 bgcolor=#E9E9E9
| 9034 Oleyuria ||  ||  || August 26, 1990 || Nauchnij || L. V. Zhuravleva || — || align=right | 11 km || 
|-id=035 bgcolor=#E9E9E9
| 9035 ||  || — || September 16, 1990 || Palomar || H. E. Holt || CLO || align=right | 10 km || 
|-id=036 bgcolor=#d6d6d6
| 9036 ||  || — || September 17, 1990 || Palomar || H. E. Holt || — || align=right | 6.0 km || 
|-id=037 bgcolor=#E9E9E9
| 9037 ||  || — || October 20, 1990 || Dynic || A. Sugie || — || align=right | 10 km || 
|-id=038 bgcolor=#E9E9E9
| 9038 Helensteel ||  ||  || November 12, 1990 || Siding Spring || D. I. Steel || EUN || align=right | 5.9 km || 
|-id=039 bgcolor=#d6d6d6
| 9039 ||  || — || November 16, 1990 || Kani || Y. Mizuno, T. Furuta || — || align=right | 11 km || 
|-id=040 bgcolor=#d6d6d6
| 9040 Flacourtia ||  ||  || January 18, 1991 || Haute-Provence || E. W. Elst || — || align=right | 14 km || 
|-id=041 bgcolor=#fefefe
| 9041 Takane || 1991 CX ||  || February 9, 1991 || Kiyosato || S. Otomo, O. Muramatsu || FLO || align=right | 2.3 km || 
|-id=042 bgcolor=#d6d6d6
| 9042 ||  || — || March 11, 1991 || La Silla || H. Debehogne || KOR || align=right | 6.9 km || 
|-id=043 bgcolor=#d6d6d6
| 9043 ||  || — || March 12, 1991 || La Silla || H. Debehogne || HYG || align=right | 24 km || 
|-id=044 bgcolor=#fefefe
| 9044 Kaoru || 1991 KA ||  || May 18, 1991 || Kiyosato || S. Otomo, O. Muramatsu || FLO || align=right | 4.6 km || 
|-id=045 bgcolor=#fefefe
| 9045 ||  || — || August 7, 1991 || Palomar || H. E. Holt || — || align=right | 6.3 km || 
|-id=046 bgcolor=#fefefe
| 9046 ||  || — || August 9, 1991 || Palomar || H. E. Holt || — || align=right | 5.4 km || 
|-id=047 bgcolor=#E9E9E9
| 9047 || 1991 QF || — || August 30, 1991 || Siding Spring || R. H. McNaught || — || align=right | 4.4 km || 
|-id=048 bgcolor=#fefefe
| 9048 ||  || — || September 12, 1991 || Palomar || H. E. Holt || — || align=right | 4.4 km || 
|-id=049 bgcolor=#fefefe
| 9049 ||  || — || September 12, 1991 || Palomar || H. E. Holt || — || align=right | 6.9 km || 
|-id=050 bgcolor=#fefefe
| 9050 ||  || — || September 13, 1991 || Palomar || H. E. Holt || — || align=right | 6.0 km || 
|-id=051 bgcolor=#fefefe
| 9051 ||  || — || October 31, 1991 || Kushiro || S. Ueda, H. Kaneda || — || align=right | 4.5 km || 
|-id=052 bgcolor=#fefefe
| 9052 Uhland ||  ||  || October 30, 1991 || Tautenburg Observatory || F. Börngen || NYS || align=right | 8.1 km || 
|-id=053 bgcolor=#E9E9E9
| 9053 Hamamelis ||  ||  || November 2, 1991 || La Silla || E. W. Elst || RAF || align=right | 5.8 km || 
|-id=054 bgcolor=#E9E9E9
| 9054 Hippocastanum || 1991 YO ||  || December 30, 1991 || Haute-Provence || E. W. Elst || EUNslow || align=right | 6.5 km || 
|-id=055 bgcolor=#E9E9E9
| 9055 Edvardsson ||  ||  || February 29, 1992 || La Silla || UESAC || CLO || align=right | 7.7 km || 
|-id=056 bgcolor=#E9E9E9
| 9056 Piskunov ||  ||  || March 1, 1992 || La Silla || UESAC || AGN || align=right | 5.3 km || 
|-id=057 bgcolor=#d6d6d6
| 9057 ||  || — || April 24, 1992 || La Silla || H. Debehogne || THM || align=right | 16 km || 
|-id=058 bgcolor=#FFC2E0
| 9058 || 1992 JB || — || May 1, 1992 || Palomar || J. Alu, K. J. Lawrence || APO +1km || align=right data-sort-value="0.90" | 900 m || 
|-id=059 bgcolor=#fefefe
| 9059 Dumas || 1992 PJ ||  || August 8, 1992 || Caussols || E. W. Elst || — || align=right | 3.2 km || 
|-id=060 bgcolor=#fefefe
| 9060 Toyokawa || 1992 RM ||  || September 4, 1992 || Kiyosato || S. Otomo || — || align=right | 3.6 km || 
|-id=061 bgcolor=#fefefe
| 9061 ||  || — || November 18, 1992 || Dynic || A. Sugie || FLO || align=right | 5.6 km || 
|-id=062 bgcolor=#fefefe
| 9062 Ohnishi ||  ||  || November 27, 1992 || Geisei || T. Seki || — || align=right | 4.4 km || 
|-id=063 bgcolor=#fefefe
| 9063 Washi || 1992 YS ||  || December 17, 1992 || Geisei || T. Seki || FLO || align=right | 3.0 km || 
|-id=064 bgcolor=#fefefe
| 9064 Johndavies ||  ||  || January 21, 1993 || Kitt Peak || Spacewatch || — || align=right | 4.0 km || 
|-id=065 bgcolor=#E9E9E9
| 9065 ||  || — || March 25, 1993 || Kushiro || S. Ueda, H. Kaneda || — || align=right | 8.8 km || 
|-id=066 bgcolor=#d6d6d6
| 9066 ||  || — || March 19, 1993 || La Silla || UESAC || — || align=right | 9.6 km || 
|-id=067 bgcolor=#E9E9E9
| 9067 Katsuno || 1993 HR ||  || April 16, 1993 || Kitami || K. Endate, K. Watanabe || — || align=right | 8.1 km || 
|-id=068 bgcolor=#FA8072
| 9068 || 1993 OD || — || July 16, 1993 || Palomar || E. F. Helin || H || align=right | 5.1 km || 
|-id=069 bgcolor=#fefefe
| 9069 Hovland || 1993 OV ||  || July 16, 1993 || Palomar || E. F. Helin || Hmoon || align=right | 3.9 km || 
|-id=070 bgcolor=#d6d6d6
| 9070 Ensab ||  ||  || July 23, 1993 || Palomar || C. S. Shoemaker, D. H. Levy || — || align=right | 6.1 km || 
|-id=071 bgcolor=#d6d6d6
| 9071 Coudenberghe ||  ||  || July 19, 1993 || La Silla || E. W. Elst || — || align=right | 10 km || 
|-id=072 bgcolor=#d6d6d6
| 9072 ||  || — || September 12, 1993 || Palomar || PCAS || URS || align=right | 24 km || 
|-id=073 bgcolor=#fefefe
| 9073 Yoshinori || 1994 ER ||  || March 4, 1994 || Ōizumi || T. Kobayashi || FLO || align=right | 3.0 km || 
|-id=074 bgcolor=#fefefe
| 9074 Yosukeyoshida || 1994 FZ ||  || March 31, 1994 || Kitami || K. Endate, K. Watanabe || ERIslow || align=right | 9.4 km || 
|-id=075 bgcolor=#fefefe
| 9075 ||  || — || April 14, 1994 || Palomar || E. F. Helin || — || align=right | 3.0 km || 
|-id=076 bgcolor=#fefefe
| 9076 Shinsaku || 1994 JT ||  || May 8, 1994 || Kuma Kogen || A. Nakamura || V || align=right | 2.0 km || 
|-id=077 bgcolor=#E9E9E9
| 9077 Ildo || 1994 NC ||  || July 3, 1994 || Farra d'Isonzo || Farra d'Isonzo || — || align=right | 4.9 km || 
|-id=078 bgcolor=#d6d6d6
| 9078 ||  || — || August 9, 1994 || Palomar || PCAS || KOR || align=right | 6.8 km || 
|-id=079 bgcolor=#d6d6d6
| 9079 Gesner ||  ||  || August 10, 1994 || La Silla || E. W. Elst || EOS || align=right | 8.8 km || 
|-id=080 bgcolor=#d6d6d6
| 9080 Takayanagi || 1994 TP ||  || October 2, 1994 || Kitami || K. Endate, K. Watanabe || — || align=right | 11 km || 
|-id=081 bgcolor=#d6d6d6
| 9081 Hideakianno || 1994 VY ||  || November 3, 1994 || Kuma Kogen || A. Nakamura || EOS || align=right | 5.5 km || 
|-id=082 bgcolor=#FA8072
| 9082 Leonardmartin ||  ||  || November 4, 1994 || Palomar || C. S. Shoemaker, E. M. Shoemaker || — || align=right | 8.5 km || 
|-id=083 bgcolor=#E9E9E9
| 9083 Ramboehm ||  ||  || November 28, 1994 || Palomar || C. S. Shoemaker, D. H. Levy || — || align=right | 8.7 km || 
|-id=084 bgcolor=#fefefe
| 9084 Achristou ||  ||  || February 3, 1995 || Siding Spring || D. J. Asher || H || align=right | 1.9 km || 
|-id=085 bgcolor=#fefefe
| 9085 ||  || — || August 24, 1995 || Nachi-Katsuura || Y. Shimizu, T. Urata || V || align=right | 2.4 km || 
|-id=086 bgcolor=#fefefe
| 9086 ||  || — || September 20, 1995 || Kushiro || S. Ueda, H. Kaneda || — || align=right | 7.4 km || 
|-id=087 bgcolor=#fefefe
| 9087 Neff ||  ||  || September 29, 1995 || Kleť || Kleť Obs. || FLO || align=right | 2.6 km || 
|-id=088 bgcolor=#fefefe
| 9088 Maki ||  ||  || September 20, 1995 || Kitami || K. Endate, K. Watanabe || FLO || align=right | 3.9 km || 
|-id=089 bgcolor=#fefefe
| 9089 ||  || — || October 26, 1995 || Nachi-Katsuura || Y. Shimizu, T. Urata || V || align=right | 4.3 km || 
|-id=090 bgcolor=#E9E9E9
| 9090 Chirotenmondai ||  ||  || October 28, 1995 || Kitami || K. Endate, K. Watanabe || — || align=right | 18 km || 
|-id=091 bgcolor=#fefefe
| 9091 Ishidatakaki || 1995 VK ||  || November 2, 1995 || Ōizumi || T. Kobayashi || NYS || align=right | 4.3 km || 
|-id=092 bgcolor=#d6d6d6
| 9092 Nanyang ||  ||  || November 4, 1995 || Xinglong || SCAP || EOS || align=right | 17 km || 
|-id=093 bgcolor=#E9E9E9
| 9093 Sorada || 1995 WA ||  || November 16, 1995 || Ōizumi || T. Kobayashi || — || align=right | 7.0 km || 
|-id=094 bgcolor=#d6d6d6
| 9094 Butsuen || 1995 WH ||  || November 16, 1995 || Ōizumi || T. Kobayashi || — || align=right | 12 km || 
|-id=095 bgcolor=#fefefe
| 9095 ||  || — || November 16, 1995 || Kushiro || S. Ueda, H. Kaneda || FLO || align=right | 3.0 km || 
|-id=096 bgcolor=#d6d6d6
| 9096 Tamotsu ||  ||  || December 15, 1995 || Ōizumi || T. Kobayashi || — || align=right | 14 km || 
|-id=097 bgcolor=#d6d6d6
| 9097 Davidschlag ||  ||  || January 14, 1996 || Linz || Davidschlag Obs. || THM || align=right | 12 km || 
|-id=098 bgcolor=#d6d6d6
| 9098 Toshihiko ||  ||  || January 27, 1996 || Ōizumi || T. Kobayashi || — || align=right | 7.1 km || 
|-id=099 bgcolor=#d6d6d6
| 9099 Kenjitanabe ||  ||  || November 6, 1996 || Ōizumi || T. Kobayashi || — || align=right | 10 km || 
|-id=100 bgcolor=#fefefe
| 9100 Tomohisa ||  ||  || December 2, 1996 || Ōizumi || T. Kobayashi || — || align=right | 5.5 km || 
|}

9101–9200 

|-bgcolor=#fefefe
| 9101 Rossiglione ||  ||  || December 3, 1996 || Farra d'Isonzo || Farra d'Isonzo || — || align=right | 2.4 km || 
|-id=102 bgcolor=#d6d6d6
| 9102 Foglar ||  ||  || December 12, 1996 || Kleť || M. Tichý, Z. Moravec || — || align=right | 8.7 km || 
|-id=103 bgcolor=#fefefe
| 9103 Komatsubara ||  ||  || December 14, 1996 || Oizumi || T. Kobayashi || — || align=right | 4.3 km || 
|-id=104 bgcolor=#E9E9E9
| 9104 Matsuo || 1996 YB ||  || December 20, 1996 || Oizumi || T. Kobayashi || DOR || align=right | 8.6 km || 
|-id=105 bgcolor=#d6d6d6
| 9105 Matsumura || 1997 AU ||  || January 2, 1997 || Oizumi || T. Kobayashi || KOR || align=right | 5.5 km || 
|-id=106 bgcolor=#fefefe
| 9106 Yatagarasu ||  ||  || January 3, 1997 || Oizumi || T. Kobayashi || — || align=right | 5.6 km || 
|-id=107 bgcolor=#d6d6d6
| 9107 Narukospa ||  ||  || January 6, 1997 || Oizumi || T. Kobayashi || — || align=right | 19 km || 
|-id=108 bgcolor=#E9E9E9
| 9108 Toruyusa ||  ||  || January 9, 1997 || Oizumi || T. Kobayashi || — || align=right | 3.2 km || 
|-id=109 bgcolor=#fefefe
| 9109 Yukomotizuki ||  ||  || January 9, 1997 || Oizumi || T. Kobayashi || V || align=right | 2.7 km || 
|-id=110 bgcolor=#fefefe
| 9110 Choukai ||  ||  || January 13, 1997 || Nanyo || T. Okuni || — || align=right | 4.5 km || 
|-id=111 bgcolor=#fefefe
| 9111 Matarazzo ||  ||  || January 28, 1997 || Sormano || P. Sicoli, F. Manca || — || align=right | 5.9 km || 
|-id=112 bgcolor=#d6d6d6
| 9112 Hatsulars ||  ||  || January 31, 1997 || Oizumi || T. Kobayashi || THM || align=right | 13 km || 
|-id=113 bgcolor=#E9E9E9
| 9113 ||  || — || February 3, 1997 || Nachi-Katsuura || Y. Shimizu, T. Urata || — || align=right | 5.9 km || 
|-id=114 bgcolor=#fefefe
| 9114 Hatakeyama ||  ||  || February 12, 1997 || Oizumi || T. Kobayashi || — || align=right | 5.5 km || 
|-id=115 bgcolor=#fefefe
| 9115 Battisti || 1997 DG ||  || February 27, 1997 || Sormano || P. Sicoli, F. Manca || V || align=right | 5.7 km || 
|-id=116 bgcolor=#fefefe
| 9116 Billhamilton ||  ||  || March 7, 1997 || Anderson Mesa || M. W. Buie || FLO || align=right | 2.6 km || 
|-id=117 bgcolor=#fefefe
| 9117 Aude ||  ||  || March 27, 1997 || Martigues || D. Morata, S. Morata || — || align=right | 6.5 km || 
|-id=118 bgcolor=#d6d6d6
| 9118 ||  || — || April 5, 1997 || Socorro || LINEAR || — || align=right | 7.8 km || 
|-id=119 bgcolor=#d6d6d6
| 9119 Georgpeuerbach || 1998 DT ||  || February 18, 1998 || Linz || Davidschlag Obs. || — || align=right | 9.5 km || 
|-id=120 bgcolor=#fefefe
| 9120 ||  || — || February 22, 1998 || Xinglong || SCAP || FLO || align=right | 5.5 km || 
|-id=121 bgcolor=#d6d6d6
| 9121 Stefanovalentini ||  ||  || February 24, 1998 || Colleverde || V. S. Casulli || 3:2 || align=right | 30 km || 
|-id=122 bgcolor=#d6d6d6
| 9122 Hunten ||  ||  || March 22, 1998 || Kitt Peak || Spacewatch || KOR || align=right | 4.0 km || 
|-id=123 bgcolor=#E9E9E9
| 9123 Yoshiko ||  ||  || March 24, 1998 || Gekko || T. Kagawa || MIT || align=right | 11 km || 
|-id=124 bgcolor=#d6d6d6
| 9124 ||  || — || March 20, 1998 || Socorro || LINEAR || — || align=right | 4.8 km || 
|-id=125 bgcolor=#fefefe
| 9125 ||  || — || March 20, 1998 || Socorro || LINEAR || — || align=right | 3.4 km || 
|-id=126 bgcolor=#E9E9E9
| 9126 Samcoulson ||  ||  || March 20, 1998 || Socorro || LINEAR || — || align=right | 2.8 km || 
|-id=127 bgcolor=#d6d6d6
| 9127 Brucekoehn ||  ||  || April 30, 1998 || Anderson Mesa || LONEOS || — || align=right | 9.9 km || 
|-id=128 bgcolor=#fefefe
| 9128 Takatumuzi ||  ||  || April 30, 1998 || Nanyo || T. Okuni || — || align=right | 4.7 km || 
|-id=129 bgcolor=#d6d6d6
| 9129 ||  || — || April 21, 1998 || Socorro || LINEAR || — || align=right | 8.5 km || 
|-id=130 bgcolor=#fefefe
| 9130 Galois ||  ||  || April 25, 1998 || La Silla || E. W. Elst || NYS || align=right | 3.7 km || 
|-id=131 bgcolor=#fefefe
| 9131 || 1998 JV || — || May 1, 1998 || Haleakalā || NEAT || NYS || align=right | 3.5 km || 
|-id=132 bgcolor=#d6d6d6
| 9132 Walteranderson || 2821 P-L ||  || September 24, 1960 || Palomar || PLS || THM || align=right | 16 km || 
|-id=133 bgcolor=#E9E9E9
| 9133 d'Arrest || 3107 P-L ||  || September 25, 1960 || Palomar || PLS || EUN || align=right | 4.4 km || 
|-id=134 bgcolor=#d6d6d6
| 9134 Encke || 4822 P-L ||  || September 24, 1960 || Palomar || PLS || KOR || align=right | 4.6 km || 
|-id=135 bgcolor=#fefefe
| 9135 Lacaille || 7609 P-L ||  || October 17, 1960 || Palomar || PLS || — || align=right | 2.9 km || 
|-id=136 bgcolor=#fefefe
| 9136 Lalande || 4886 T-1 ||  || May 13, 1971 || Palomar || PLS || V || align=right | 3.7 km || 
|-id=137 bgcolor=#fefefe
| 9137 Remo || 2114 T-2 ||  || September 29, 1973 || Palomar || PLS || — || align=right | 4.3 km || 
|-id=138 bgcolor=#fefefe
| 9138 Murdoch || 2280 T-2 ||  || September 29, 1973 || Palomar || PLS || FLO || align=right | 3.1 km || 
|-id=139 bgcolor=#fefefe
| 9139 Barrylasker || 4180 T-2 ||  || September 29, 1973 || Palomar || PLS || EUT || align=right | 2.8 km || 
|-id=140 bgcolor=#fefefe
| 9140 Deni || 4195 T-3 ||  || October 16, 1977 || Palomar || PLS || — || align=right | 4.5 km || 
|-id=141 bgcolor=#d6d6d6
| 9141 Kapur || 5174 T-3 ||  || October 16, 1977 || Palomar || PLS || — || align=right | 21 km || 
|-id=142 bgcolor=#C2FFFF
| 9142 Rhesus || 5191 T-3 ||  || October 16, 1977 || Palomar || PLS || L5 || align=right | 42 km || 
|-id=143 bgcolor=#fefefe
| 9143 Burkhead || 1955 SF ||  || September 16, 1955 || Brooklyn || Indiana University || FLO || align=right | 4.4 km || 
|-id=144 bgcolor=#fefefe
| 9144 Hollisjohnson ||  ||  || October 25, 1955 || Brooklyn || Indiana University || — || align=right | 11 km || 
|-id=145 bgcolor=#E9E9E9
| 9145 Shustov ||  ||  || April 1, 1976 || Nauchnij || N. S. Chernykh || — || align=right | 8.0 km || 
|-id=146 bgcolor=#fefefe
| 9146 Tulikov ||  ||  || December 16, 1976 || Nauchnij || L. I. Chernykh || — || align=right | 7.0 km || 
|-id=147 bgcolor=#fefefe
| 9147 Kourakuen ||  ||  || February 18, 1977 || Kiso || H. Kosai, K. Furukawa || — || align=right | 4.9 km || 
|-id=148 bgcolor=#fefefe
| 9148 Boriszaitsev ||  ||  || March 13, 1977 || Nauchnij || N. S. Chernykh || — || align=right | 3.7 km || 
|-id=149 bgcolor=#E9E9E9
| 9149 ||  || — || October 12, 1977 || Zimmerwald || P. Wild || EUN || align=right | 7.2 km || 
|-id=150 bgcolor=#E9E9E9
| 9150 Zavolokin ||  ||  || September 27, 1978 || Nauchnij || L. I. Chernykh || — || align=right | 5.2 km || 
|-id=151 bgcolor=#fefefe
| 9151 Kettnergriswold ||  ||  || June 25, 1979 || Siding Spring || E. F. Helin, S. J. Bus || — || align=right | 4.7 km || 
|-id=152 bgcolor=#fefefe
| 9152 Combe ||  ||  || November 1, 1980 || Palomar || S. J. Bus || ERI || align=right | 5.0 km || 
|-id=153 bgcolor=#E9E9E9
| 9153 Chikurinji ||  ||  || October 30, 1981 || Kiso || H. Kosai, K. Furukawa || EUN || align=right | 7.2 km || 
|-id=154 bgcolor=#d6d6d6
| 9154 Kolʹtsovo ||  ||  || September 16, 1982 || Nauchnij || L. I. Chernykh || EOS || align=right | 9.9 km || 
|-id=155 bgcolor=#d6d6d6
| 9155 Verkhodanov ||  ||  || September 18, 1982 || Nauchnij || N. S. Chernykh || — || align=right | 15 km || 
|-id=156 bgcolor=#fefefe
| 9156 Malanin ||  ||  || October 15, 1982 || Nauchnij || L. V. Zhuravleva || — || align=right | 3.6 km || 
|-id=157 bgcolor=#fefefe
| 9157 ||  || — || September 2, 1983 || Anderson Mesa || N. G. Thomas || NYS || align=right | 3.1 km || 
|-id=158 bgcolor=#fefefe
| 9158 Platè || 1984 MR ||  || June 25, 1984 || Nauchnij || T. M. Smirnova || V || align=right | 4.7 km || 
|-id=159 bgcolor=#fefefe
| 9159 McDonnell ||  ||  || October 26, 1984 || Anderson Mesa || E. Bowell || V || align=right | 3.5 km || 
|-id=160 bgcolor=#E9E9E9
| 9160 ||  || — || October 28, 1986 || Kleť || Z. Vávrová || — || align=right | 5.5 km || 
|-id=161 bgcolor=#E9E9E9
| 9161 Beaufort ||  ||  || January 26, 1987 || La Silla || E. W. Elst || — || align=right | 6.3 km || 
|-id=162 bgcolor=#FFC2E0
| 9162 Kwiila || 1987 OA ||  || July 29, 1987 || Palomar || J. E. Mueller || APO +1km || align=right | 1.1 km || 
|-id=163 bgcolor=#d6d6d6
| 9163 ||  || — || September 13, 1987 || La Silla || H. Debehogne || THM || align=right | 9.0 km || 
|-id=164 bgcolor=#d6d6d6
| 9164 Colbert || 1987 SQ ||  || September 19, 1987 || Anderson Mesa || E. Bowell || HYG || align=right | 14 km || 
|-id=165 bgcolor=#fefefe
| 9165 Raup ||  ||  || September 27, 1987 || Palomar || C. S. Shoemaker, E. M. Shoemaker || Hslow || align=right | 4.8 km || 
|-id=166 bgcolor=#d6d6d6
| 9166 ||  || — || September 21, 1987 || Kleť || Z. Vávrová || THM || align=right | 9.4 km || 
|-id=167 bgcolor=#d6d6d6
| 9167 Kharkiv ||  ||  || September 18, 1987 || Nauchnij || L. I. Chernykh || — || align=right | 18 km || 
|-id=168 bgcolor=#fefefe
| 9168 Sarov ||  ||  || September 18, 1987 || Nauchnij || L. I. Chernykh || — || align=right | 5.8 km || 
|-id=169 bgcolor=#fefefe
| 9169 ||  || — || October 13, 1988 || Kushiro || S. Ueda, H. Kaneda || FLO || align=right | 3.8 km || 
|-id=170 bgcolor=#fefefe
| 9170 ||  || — || October 3, 1988 || Kushiro || S. Ueda, H. Kaneda || FLO || align=right | 3.9 km || 
|-id=171 bgcolor=#E9E9E9
| 9171 Carolyndiane ||  ||  || April 4, 1989 || La Silla || E. W. Elst || MAR || align=right | 7.3 km || 
|-id=172 bgcolor=#FFC2E0
| 9172 Abhramu || 1989 OB ||  || July 29, 1989 || Palomar || C. S. Shoemaker, E. M. Shoemaker || AMO +1km || align=right | 1.7 km || 
|-id=173 bgcolor=#E9E9E9
| 9173 Viola Castello ||  ||  || October 4, 1989 || La Silla || H. Debehogne || GEF || align=right | 8.2 km || 
|-id=174 bgcolor=#fefefe
| 9174 ||  || — || November 27, 1989 || Gekko || Y. Oshima || — || align=right | 3.8 km || 
|-id=175 bgcolor=#E9E9E9
| 9175 Graun ||  ||  || July 29, 1990 || Palomar || H. E. Holt || MAR || align=right | 7.9 km || 
|-id=176 bgcolor=#E9E9E9
| 9176 Struchkova ||  ||  || November 15, 1990 || Nauchnij || L. I. Chernykh || — || align=right | 7.2 km || 
|-id=177 bgcolor=#E9E9E9
| 9177 Donsaari || 1990 YA ||  || December 18, 1990 || Palomar || E. F. Helin || — || align=right | 5.6 km || 
|-id=178 bgcolor=#d6d6d6
| 9178 Momoyo || 1991 DU ||  || February 23, 1991 || Karasuyama || S. Inoda, T. Urata || KOR || align=right | 5.6 km || 
|-id=179 bgcolor=#d6d6d6
| 9179 Satchmo ||  ||  || March 13, 1991 || Harvard Observatory || Oak Ridge Observatory || EOS || align=right | 8.9 km || 
|-id=180 bgcolor=#d6d6d6
| 9180 Samsagan || 1991 GQ ||  || April 8, 1991 || Palomar || E. F. Helin || URS || align=right | 16 km || 
|-id=181 bgcolor=#fefefe
| 9181 ||  || — || July 14, 1991 || Palomar || H. E. Holt || — || align=right | 3.9 km || 
|-id=182 bgcolor=#fefefe
| 9182 ||  || — || July 8, 1991 || La Silla || H. Debehogne || — || align=right | 6.8 km || 
|-id=183 bgcolor=#fefefe
| 9183 || 1991 OW || — || July 18, 1991 || Palomar || H. E. Holt || — || align=right | 2.8 km || 
|-id=184 bgcolor=#fefefe
| 9184 Vasilij ||  ||  || August 2, 1991 || La Silla || E. W. Elst || FLO || align=right | 3.4 km || 
|-id=185 bgcolor=#fefefe
| 9185 ||  || — || August 7, 1991 || Palomar || H. E. Holt || V || align=right | 4.4 km || 
|-id=186 bgcolor=#fefefe
| 9186 Fumikotsukimoto ||  ||  || September 7, 1991 || Palomar || E. F. Helin || PHO || align=right | 4.3 km || 
|-id=187 bgcolor=#fefefe
| 9187 Walterkröll ||  ||  || September 12, 1991 || Tautenburg Observatory || L. D. Schmadel, F. Börngen || — || align=right | 3.3 km || 
|-id=188 bgcolor=#fefefe
| 9188 ||  || — || September 15, 1991 || Palomar || H. E. Holt || NYS || align=right | 3.2 km || 
|-id=189 bgcolor=#fefefe
| 9189 Hölderlin ||  ||  || September 10, 1991 || Tautenburg Observatory || F. Börngen || — || align=right | 4.3 km || 
|-id=190 bgcolor=#fefefe
| 9190 Masako ||  ||  || November 4, 1991 || Yatsugatake || Y. Kushida, O. Muramatsu || — || align=right | 11 km || 
|-id=191 bgcolor=#E9E9E9
| 9191 Hokuto || 1991 XU ||  || December 13, 1991 || Kiyosato || S. Otomo || EUN || align=right | 8.6 km || 
|-id=192 bgcolor=#E9E9E9
| 9192 ||  || — || January 14, 1992 || Kushiro || S. Ueda, H. Kaneda || — || align=right | 12 km || 
|-id=193 bgcolor=#E9E9E9
| 9193 Geoffreycopland ||  ||  || March 10, 1992 || Siding Spring || D. I. Steel || — || align=right | 11 km || 
|-id=194 bgcolor=#fefefe
| 9194 Ananoff ||  ||  || July 26, 1992 || La Silla || E. W. Elst || — || align=right | 3.7 km || 
|-id=195 bgcolor=#d6d6d6
| 9195 ||  || — || July 26, 1992 || La Silla || H. Debehogne, Á. López-G. || THM || align=right | 13 km || 
|-id=196 bgcolor=#fefefe
| 9196 Sukagawa ||  ||  || November 27, 1992 || Geisei || T. Seki || — || align=right | 4.7 km || 
|-id=197 bgcolor=#fefefe
| 9197 Endo ||  ||  || November 24, 1992 || Nyukasa || M. Hirasawa, S. Suzuki || — || align=right | 3.2 km || 
|-id=198 bgcolor=#fefefe
| 9198 Sasagamine ||  ||  || January 25, 1993 || Geisei || T. Seki || — || align=right | 3.6 km || 
|-id=199 bgcolor=#fefefe
| 9199 ||  || — || March 25, 1993 || Kushiro || S. Ueda, H. Kaneda || V || align=right | 5.2 km || 
|-id=200 bgcolor=#fefefe
| 9200 ||  || — || March 21, 1993 || La Silla || UESAC || NYS || align=right | 8.9 km || 
|}

9201–9300 

|-bgcolor=#d6d6d6
| 9201 ||  || — || March 19, 1993 || La Silla || UESAC || — || align=right | 14 km || 
|-id=202 bgcolor=#FFC2E0
| 9202 || 1993 PB || — || August 13, 1993 || Kitt Peak || Spacewatch || APO +1km || align=right | 1.6 km || 
|-id=203 bgcolor=#d6d6d6
| 9203 Myrtus ||  ||  || October 9, 1993 || La Silla || E. W. Elst || THM || align=right | 18 km || 
|-id=204 bgcolor=#fefefe
| 9204 Mörike ||  ||  || August 4, 1994 || Tautenburg Observatory || F. Börngen || V || align=right | 5.2 km || 
|-id=205 bgcolor=#d6d6d6
| 9205 Eddywally ||  ||  || August 10, 1994 || La Silla || E. W. Elst || — || align=right | 13 km || 
|-id=206 bgcolor=#fefefe
| 9206 Yanaikeizo || 1994 RQ ||  || September 1, 1994 || Kitami || K. Endate, K. Watanabe || — || align=right | 3.4 km || 
|-id=207 bgcolor=#E9E9E9
| 9207 Petersmith ||  ||  || September 29, 1994 || Kitt Peak || Spacewatch || — || align=right | 6.3 km || 
|-id=208 bgcolor=#E9E9E9
| 9208 Takanotoshi ||  ||  || October 2, 1994 || Kitami || K. Endate, K. Watanabe || — || align=right | 7.8 km || 
|-id=209 bgcolor=#E9E9E9
| 9209 ||  || — || October 25, 1994 || Kushiro || S. Ueda, H. Kaneda || — || align=right | 11 km || 
|-id=210 bgcolor=#d6d6d6
| 9210 ||  || — || January 27, 1995 || Kushiro || S. Ueda, H. Kaneda || — || align=right | 8.6 km || 
|-id=211 bgcolor=#fefefe
| 9211 Neese ||  ||  || September 19, 1995 || Kitt Peak || Spacewatch || — || align=right | 5.9 km || 
|-id=212 bgcolor=#fefefe
| 9212 Kanamaru ||  ||  || October 20, 1995 || Oizumi || T. Kobayashi || V || align=right | 3.1 km || 
|-id=213 bgcolor=#fefefe
| 9213 ||  || — || October 21, 1995 || Kushiro || S. Ueda, H. Kaneda || V || align=right | 3.2 km || 
|-id=214 bgcolor=#fefefe
| 9214 ||  || — || October 21, 1995 || Kushiro || S. Ueda, H. Kaneda || — || align=right | 4.6 km || 
|-id=215 bgcolor=#fefefe
| 9215 Taiyonoto ||  ||  || October 28, 1995 || Kitami || K. Endate, K. Watanabe || — || align=right | 4.3 km || 
|-id=216 bgcolor=#fefefe
| 9216 Masuzawa || 1995 VS ||  || November 1, 1995 || Kiyosato || S. Otomo || — || align=right | 4.1 km || 
|-id=217 bgcolor=#fefefe
| 9217 Kitagawa || 1995 WN ||  || November 16, 1995 || Oizumi || T. Kobayashi || — || align=right | 2.3 km || 
|-id=218 bgcolor=#fefefe
| 9218 Ishiikazuo ||  ||  || November 20, 1995 || Oizumi || T. Kobayashi || FLO || align=right | 3.7 km || 
|-id=219 bgcolor=#d6d6d6
| 9219 ||  || — || November 18, 1995 || Nachi-Katsuura || Y. Shimizu, T. Urata || THB || align=right | 19 km || 
|-id=220 bgcolor=#fefefe
| 9220 Yoshidayama ||  ||  || December 15, 1995 || Oizumi || T. Kobayashi || V || align=right | 3.7 km || 
|-id=221 bgcolor=#fefefe
| 9221 Wuliangyong ||  ||  || December 2, 1995 || Xinglong || SCAP || — || align=right | 3.0 km || 
|-id=222 bgcolor=#d6d6d6
| 9222 Chubey || 1995 YM ||  || December 19, 1995 || Oizumi || T. Kobayashi || TIR || align=right | 10 km || 
|-id=223 bgcolor=#fefefe
| 9223 Leifandersson ||  ||  || December 18, 1995 || Kitt Peak || Spacewatch || — || align=right | 4.5 km || 
|-id=224 bgcolor=#fefefe
| 9224 Železný || 1996 AE ||  || January 10, 1996 || Kleť || M. Tichý, Z. Moravec || — || align=right | 3.5 km || 
|-id=225 bgcolor=#E9E9E9
| 9225 Daiki || 1996 AU ||  || January 10, 1996 || Oizumi || T. Kobayashi || — || align=right | 5.0 km || 
|-id=226 bgcolor=#d6d6d6
| 9226 Arimahiroshi ||  ||  || January 12, 1996 || Oizumi || T. Kobayashi || KOR || align=right | 5.6 km || 
|-id=227 bgcolor=#d6d6d6
| 9227 Ashida ||  ||  || January 26, 1996 || Oizumi || T. Kobayashi || — || align=right | 14 km || 
|-id=228 bgcolor=#d6d6d6
| 9228 Nakahiroshi ||  ||  || February 11, 1996 || Oizumi || T. Kobayashi || slow || align=right | 22 km || 
|-id=229 bgcolor=#d6d6d6
| 9229 Matsuda ||  ||  || February 20, 1996 || Kitami || K. Endate, K. Watanabe || KOR || align=right | 5.8 km || 
|-id=230 bgcolor=#d6d6d6
| 9230 Yasuda ||  ||  || December 29, 1996 || Chichibu || N. Satō || THM || align=right | 9.1 km || 
|-id=231 bgcolor=#fefefe
| 9231 Shimaken ||  ||  || January 29, 1997 || Oizumi || T. Kobayashi || — || align=right | 3.8 km || 
|-id=232 bgcolor=#fefefe
| 9232 Miretti ||  ||  || January 31, 1997 || Pianoro || V. Goretti || — || align=right | 3.3 km || 
|-id=233 bgcolor=#E9E9E9
| 9233 Itagijun ||  ||  || February 1, 1997 || Oizumi || T. Kobayashi || slow || align=right | 6.8 km || 
|-id=234 bgcolor=#fefefe
| 9234 Matsumototaku ||  ||  || February 3, 1997 || Oizumi || T. Kobayashi || — || align=right | 3.3 km || 
|-id=235 bgcolor=#fefefe
| 9235 Shimanamikaido ||  ||  || February 9, 1997 || Kuma Kogen || A. Nakamura || NYS || align=right | 1.6 km || 
|-id=236 bgcolor=#fefefe
| 9236 Obermair ||  ||  || March 12, 1997 || Linz || E. Meyer || V || align=right | 2.0 km || 
|-id=237 bgcolor=#E9E9E9
| 9237 ||  || — || April 2, 1997 || Socorro || LINEAR || — || align=right | 4.6 km || 
|-id=238 bgcolor=#d6d6d6
| 9238 Yavapai ||  ||  || April 28, 1997 || Prescott || P. G. Comba || KOR || align=right | 5.9 km || 
|-id=239 bgcolor=#fefefe
| 9239 van Riebeeck ||  ||  || May 3, 1997 || La Silla || E. W. Elst || — || align=right | 3.2 km || 
|-id=240 bgcolor=#d6d6d6
| 9240 Nassau ||  ||  || May 31, 1997 || Kitt Peak || Spacewatch || — || align=right | 10 km || 
|-id=241 bgcolor=#d6d6d6
| 9241 Rosfranklin ||  ||  || August 10, 1997 || Reedy Creek || J. Broughton || — || align=right | 12 km || 
|-id=242 bgcolor=#fefefe
| 9242 Olea ||  ||  || February 6, 1998 || La Silla || E. W. Elst || — || align=right | 2.9 km || 
|-id=243 bgcolor=#d6d6d6
| 9243 ||  || — || March 20, 1998 || Socorro || LINEAR || THM || align=right | 9.1 km || 
|-id=244 bgcolor=#d6d6d6
| 9244 Višnjan ||  ||  || April 21, 1998 || Višnjan Observatory || K. Korlević, P. Radovan || KOR || align=right | 6.4 km || 
|-id=245 bgcolor=#fefefe
| 9245 ||  || — || April 21, 1998 || Socorro || LINEAR || — || align=right | 3.6 km || 
|-id=246 bgcolor=#fefefe
| 9246 Niemeyer ||  ||  || April 25, 1998 || La Silla || E. W. Elst || EUT || align=right | 4.1 km || 
|-id=247 bgcolor=#d6d6d6
| 9247 ||  || — || June 23, 1998 || Socorro || LINEAR || — || align=right | 22 km || 
|-id=248 bgcolor=#d6d6d6
| 9248 Sauer || 4593 P-L ||  || September 24, 1960 || Palomar || PLS || KOR || align=right | 5.0 km || 
|-id=249 bgcolor=#fefefe
| 9249 Yen || 4606 P-L ||  || September 24, 1960 || Palomar || PLS || — || align=right | 3.0 km || 
|-id=250 bgcolor=#d6d6d6
| 9250 Chamberlin || 4643 P-L ||  || September 24, 1960 || Palomar || PLS || — || align=right | 8.8 km || 
|-id=251 bgcolor=#d6d6d6
| 9251 Harch || 4896 P-L ||  || September 26, 1960 || Palomar || PLS || THM || align=right | 7.4 km || 
|-id=252 bgcolor=#d6d6d6
| 9252 Goddard || 9058 P-L ||  || October 17, 1960 || Palomar || PLS || HYG || align=right | 12 km || 
|-id=253 bgcolor=#fefefe
| 9253 Oberth || 1171 T-1 ||  || March 25, 1971 || Palomar || PLS || — || align=right | 3.7 km || 
|-id=254 bgcolor=#fefefe
| 9254 Shunkai || 2151 T-1 ||  || March 25, 1971 || Palomar || PLS || — || align=right | 3.5 km || 
|-id=255 bgcolor=#fefefe
| 9255 Inoutadataka || 3174 T-1 ||  || March 26, 1971 || Palomar || PLS || — || align=right | 4.9 km || 
|-id=256 bgcolor=#fefefe
| 9256 Tsukamoto || 1324 T-2 ||  || September 29, 1973 || Palomar || PLS || FLO || align=right | 4.1 km || 
|-id=257 bgcolor=#d6d6d6
| 9257 Kunisuke || 1552 T-2 ||  || September 24, 1973 || Palomar || PLS || EOS || align=right | 11 km || 
|-id=258 bgcolor=#fefefe
| 9258 Johnpauljones || 2137 T-2 ||  || September 29, 1973 || Palomar || PLS || — || align=right | 1.8 km || 
|-id=259 bgcolor=#E9E9E9
| 9259 Janvanparadijs || 2189 T-2 ||  || September 29, 1973 || Palomar || PLS || — || align=right | 3.8 km || 
|-id=260 bgcolor=#fefefe
| 9260 Edwardolson ||  ||  || October 8, 1953 || Brooklyn || Indiana University || moon || align=right | 4.1 km || 
|-id=261 bgcolor=#fefefe
| 9261 Peggythomson ||  ||  || October 8, 1953 || Brooklyn || Indiana University || FLO || align=right | 3.7 km || 
|-id=262 bgcolor=#E9E9E9
| 9262 Bordovitsyna || 1973 RF ||  || September 6, 1973 || Nauchnij || T. M. Smirnova || MAR || align=right | 8.1 km || 
|-id=263 bgcolor=#d6d6d6
| 9263 Khariton ||  ||  || September 24, 1976 || Nauchnij || N. S. Chernykh || THM || align=right | 10 km || 
|-id=264 bgcolor=#d6d6d6
| 9264 || 1978 OQ || — || July 28, 1978 || Bickley || Perth Obs. || — || align=right | 9.2 km || 
|-id=265 bgcolor=#fefefe
| 9265 Ekman ||  ||  || September 2, 1978 || La Silla || C.-I. Lagerkvist || FLO || align=right | 2.0 km || 
|-id=266 bgcolor=#d6d6d6
| 9266 Holger ||  ||  || September 2, 1978 || La Silla || C.-I. Lagerkvist || KOR || align=right | 5.1 km || 
|-id=267 bgcolor=#d6d6d6
| 9267 Lokrume ||  ||  || September 2, 1978 || La Silla || C.-I. Lagerkvist || KOR || align=right | 5.2 km || 
|-id=268 bgcolor=#E9E9E9
| 9268 Jeremihschneider ||  ||  || November 7, 1978 || Palomar || E. F. Helin, S. J. Bus || — || align=right | 3.4 km || 
|-id=269 bgcolor=#E9E9E9
| 9269 Peterolufemi ||  ||  || November 7, 1978 || Palomar || E. F. Helin, S. J. Bus || EUN || align=right | 3.1 km || 
|-id=270 bgcolor=#d6d6d6
| 9270 Sherryjennings ||  ||  || November 7, 1978 || Palomar || E. F. Helin, S. J. Bus || THM || align=right | 11 km || 
|-id=271 bgcolor=#d6d6d6
| 9271 Trimble ||  ||  || November 7, 1978 || Palomar || E. F. Helin, S. J. Bus || — || align=right | 13 km || 
|-id=272 bgcolor=#E9E9E9
| 9272 Liseleje || 1979 KQ ||  || May 19, 1979 || La Silla || R. M. West || — || align=right | 7.2 km || 
|-id=273 bgcolor=#fefefe
| 9273 Schloerb ||  ||  || August 22, 1979 || La Silla || C.-I. Lagerkvist || — || align=right | 5.6 km || 
|-id=274 bgcolor=#E9E9E9
| 9274 Amylovell ||  ||  || March 16, 1980 || La Silla || C.-I. Lagerkvist || RAF || align=right | 5.6 km || 
|-id=275 bgcolor=#d6d6d6
| 9275 Persson ||  ||  || March 16, 1980 || La Silla || C.-I. Lagerkvist || EOS || align=right | 6.6 km || 
|-id=276 bgcolor=#fefefe
| 9276 Timgrove ||  ||  || September 13, 1980 || Palomar || S. J. Bus || — || align=right | 4.4 km || 
|-id=277 bgcolor=#fefefe
| 9277 Togashi ||  ||  || October 9, 1980 || Palomar || C. S. Shoemaker, E. M. Shoemaker || V || align=right | 3.3 km || 
|-id=278 bgcolor=#d6d6d6
| 9278 ||  || — || March 7, 1981 || La Silla || H. Debehogne, G. DeSanctis || THM || align=right | 12 km || 
|-id=279 bgcolor=#fefefe
| 9279 Seager ||  ||  || March 1, 1981 || Siding Spring || S. J. Bus || — || align=right | 3.8 km || 
|-id=280 bgcolor=#fefefe
| 9280 Stevenjoy ||  ||  || March 1, 1981 || Siding Spring || S. J. Bus || — || align=right | 3.0 km || 
|-id=281 bgcolor=#fefefe
| 9281 Weryk ||  ||  || March 1, 1981 || Siding Spring || S. J. Bus || NYS || align=right | 3.0 km || 
|-id=282 bgcolor=#fefefe
| 9282 Lucylim ||  ||  || March 6, 1981 || Siding Spring || S. J. Bus || — || align=right | 2.4 km || 
|-id=283 bgcolor=#fefefe
| 9283 Martinelvis ||  ||  || March 2, 1981 || Siding Spring || S. J. Bus || NYS || align=right | 3.1 km || 
|-id=284 bgcolor=#d6d6d6
| 9284 Juansanchez ||  ||  || March 7, 1981 || Siding Spring || S. J. Bus || — || align=right | 5.4 km || 
|-id=285 bgcolor=#d6d6d6
| 9285 Le Corre ||  ||  || March 2, 1981 || Siding Spring || S. J. Bus || KOR || align=right | 6.1 km || 
|-id=286 bgcolor=#fefefe
| 9286 Patricktaylor ||  ||  || March 2, 1981 || Siding Spring || S. J. Bus || — || align=right | 2.9 km || 
|-id=287 bgcolor=#d6d6d6
| 9287 Klima ||  ||  || March 6, 1981 || Siding Spring || S. J. Bus || KOR || align=right | 5.2 km || 
|-id=288 bgcolor=#fefefe
| 9288 Santos-Sanz ||  ||  || March 2, 1981 || Siding Spring || S. J. Bus || — || align=right | 2.0 km || 
|-id=289 bgcolor=#E9E9E9
| 9289 Balau ||  ||  || August 26, 1981 || La Silla || H. Debehogne || — || align=right | 6.3 km || 
|-id=290 bgcolor=#fefefe
| 9290 || 1981 TT || — || October 6, 1981 || Kleť || Z. Vávrová || FLO || align=right | 3.0 km || 
|-id=291 bgcolor=#d6d6d6
| 9291 Alanburdick || 1982 QO ||  || August 17, 1982 || Harvard Observatory || Oak Ridge Observatory || EOS || align=right | 8.7 km || 
|-id=292 bgcolor=#FA8072
| 9292 ||  || — || October 16, 1982 || Kleť || A. Mrkos || — || align=right | 2.7 km || 
|-id=293 bgcolor=#d6d6d6
| 9293 Kamogata ||  ||  || December 13, 1982 || Kiso || H. Kosai, K. Furukawa || THM || align=right | 15 km || 
|-id=294 bgcolor=#E9E9E9
| 9294 || 1983 EV || — || March 10, 1983 || Anderson Mesa || E. Barr || — || align=right | 13 km || 
|-id=295 bgcolor=#fefefe
| 9295 Donaldyoung ||  ||  || September 2, 1983 || Anderson Mesa || E. Bowell || V || align=right | 3.0 km || 
|-id=296 bgcolor=#fefefe
| 9296 ||  || — || September 5, 1983 || Kleť || Z. Vávrová || — || align=right | 7.8 km || 
|-id=297 bgcolor=#E9E9E9
| 9297 Marchuk || 1984 MP ||  || June 25, 1984 || Nauchnij || T. M. Smirnova || EUN || align=right | 9.4 km || 
|-id=298 bgcolor=#E9E9E9
| 9298 Geake || 1985 JM ||  || May 15, 1985 || Anderson Mesa || E. Bowell || MIT || align=right | 14 km || 
|-id=299 bgcolor=#E9E9E9
| 9299 Vinceteri ||  ||  || May 13, 1985 || Palomar || C. S. Shoemaker, E. M. Shoemaker || — || align=right | 6.5 km || 
|-id=300 bgcolor=#E9E9E9
| 9300 Johannes || 1985 PS ||  || August 14, 1985 || Anderson Mesa || E. Bowell || — || align=right | 7.3 km || 
|}

9301–9400 

|-bgcolor=#fefefe
| 9301 ||  || — || September 10, 1985 || La Silla || H. Debehogne || — || align=right | 2.3 km || 
|-id=302 bgcolor=#fefefe
| 9302 ||  || — || October 12, 1985 || Zimmerwald || P. Wild || — || align=right | 3.1 km || 
|-id=303 bgcolor=#E9E9E9
| 9303 ||  || — || August 29, 1986 || La Silla || H. Debehogne || — || align=right | 4.1 km || 
|-id=304 bgcolor=#E9E9E9
| 9304 ||  || — || September 1, 1986 || La Silla || H. Debehogne || — || align=right | 4.4 km || 
|-id=305 bgcolor=#fefefe
| 9305 Hazard ||  ||  || October 7, 1986 || Anderson Mesa || E. Bowell || — || align=right | 2.9 km || 
|-id=306 bgcolor=#d6d6d6
| 9306 Pittosporum || 1987 CG ||  || February 2, 1987 || La Silla || E. W. Elst || KOR || align=right | 7.2 km || 
|-id=307 bgcolor=#fefefe
| 9307 Regiomontanus || 1987 QS ||  || August 21, 1987 || Tautenburg Observatory || F. Börngen || V || align=right | 2.9 km || 
|-id=308 bgcolor=#fefefe
| 9308 Randyrose ||  ||  || September 21, 1987 || Anderson Mesa || E. Bowell || — || align=right | 4.3 km || 
|-id=309 bgcolor=#d6d6d6
| 9309 Platanus ||  ||  || September 20, 1987 || Smolyan || E. W. Elst || THM || align=right | 8.3 km || 
|-id=310 bgcolor=#d6d6d6
| 9310 ||  || — || September 18, 1987 || La Silla || H. Debehogne || THM || align=right | 13 km || 
|-id=311 bgcolor=#fefefe
| 9311 ||  || — || October 25, 1987 || Kushiro || S. Ueda, H. Kaneda || — || align=right | 4.0 km || 
|-id=312 bgcolor=#E9E9E9
| 9312 ||  || — || November 15, 1987 || Kushiro || S. Ueda, H. Kaneda || GEF || align=right | 6.5 km || 
|-id=313 bgcolor=#E9E9E9
| 9313 Protea ||  ||  || February 13, 1988 || La Silla || E. W. Elst || — || align=right | 4.7 km || 
|-id=314 bgcolor=#fefefe
| 9314 ||  || — || February 19, 1988 || Gekko || Y. Oshima || — || align=right | 7.2 km || 
|-id=315 bgcolor=#fefefe
| 9315 Weigel ||  ||  || August 13, 1988 || Tautenburg Observatory || F. Börngen || — || align=right | 3.9 km || 
|-id=316 bgcolor=#d6d6d6
| 9316 Rhamnus ||  ||  || August 12, 1988 || Haute-Provence || E. W. Elst || — || align=right | 16 km || 
|-id=317 bgcolor=#d6d6d6
| 9317 ||  || — || September 1, 1988 || La Silla || H. Debehogne || EOS || align=right | 8.6 km || 
|-id=318 bgcolor=#fefefe
| 9318 ||  || — || September 6, 1988 || La Silla || H. Debehogne || — || align=right | 2.5 km || 
|-id=319 bgcolor=#fefefe
| 9319 Hartzell ||  ||  || September 14, 1988 || Cerro Tololo || S. J. Bus || NYS || align=right | 5.5 km || 
|-id=320 bgcolor=#fefefe
| 9320 ||  || — || November 11, 1988 || Gekko || Y. Oshima || FLO || align=right | 2.5 km || 
|-id=321 bgcolor=#d6d6d6
| 9321 Alexkonopliv || 1989 AK ||  || January 5, 1989 || Chiyoda || T. Kojima || — || align=right | 10 km || 
|-id=322 bgcolor=#d6d6d6
| 9322 Lindenau ||  ||  || January 10, 1989 || Tautenburg Observatory || F. Börngen || THM || align=right | 9.9 km || 
|-id=323 bgcolor=#fefefe
| 9323 Hirohisasato ||  ||  || February 11, 1989 || Geisei || T. Seki || slow || align=right | 6.8 km || 
|-id=324 bgcolor=#fefefe
| 9324 ||  || — || February 7, 1989 || Kushiro || S. Ueda, H. Kaneda || NYS || align=right | 3.7 km || 
|-id=325 bgcolor=#fefefe
| 9325 Stonehenge ||  ||  || April 3, 1989 || La Silla || E. W. Elst || V || align=right | 4.0 km || 
|-id=326 bgcolor=#E9E9E9
| 9326 Ruta ||  ||  || September 26, 1989 || La Silla || E. W. Elst || HOF || align=right | 10 km || 
|-id=327 bgcolor=#d6d6d6
| 9327 Duerbeck ||  ||  || September 26, 1989 || La Silla || E. W. Elst || — || align=right | 14 km || 
|-id=328 bgcolor=#fefefe
| 9328 ||  || — || February 24, 1990 || La Silla || H. Debehogne || — || align=right | 5.7 km || 
|-id=329 bgcolor=#fefefe
| 9329 Nikolaimedtner || 1990 EO ||  || March 2, 1990 || La Silla || E. W. Elst || V || align=right | 4.1 km || 
|-id=330 bgcolor=#d6d6d6
| 9330 ||  || — || March 3, 1990 || La Silla || H. Debehogne || THM || align=right | 12 km || 
|-id=331 bgcolor=#E9E9E9
| 9331 Fannyhensel ||  ||  || August 16, 1990 || La Silla || E. W. Elst || — || align=right | 3.6 km || 
|-id=332 bgcolor=#E9E9E9
| 9332 ||  || — || September 16, 1990 || Palomar || H. E. Holt || EUNmoon || align=right | 6.2 km || 
|-id=333 bgcolor=#E9E9E9
| 9333 Hiraimasa ||  ||  || October 15, 1990 || Kitami || K. Endate, K. Watanabe || — || align=right | 9.7 km || 
|-id=334 bgcolor=#E9E9E9
| 9334 Moesta ||  ||  || October 16, 1990 || La Silla || E. W. Elst || EUN || align=right | 5.4 km || 
|-id=335 bgcolor=#E9E9E9
| 9335 ||  || — || January 10, 1991 || Yatsugatake || Y. Kushida, O. Muramatsu || slow || align=right | 6.4 km || 
|-id=336 bgcolor=#fefefe
| 9336 Altenburg ||  ||  || January 15, 1991 || Tautenburg Observatory || F. Börngen || — || align=right | 2.7 km || 
|-id=337 bgcolor=#d6d6d6
| 9337 ||  || — || March 17, 1991 || La Silla || H. Debehogne || KOR || align=right | 5.9 km || 
|-id=338 bgcolor=#d6d6d6
| 9338 ||  || — || March 25, 1991 || La Silla || H. Debehogne || — || align=right | 23 km || 
|-id=339 bgcolor=#d6d6d6
| 9339 Kimnovak ||  ||  || April 8, 1991 || La Silla || E. W. Elst || THM || align=right | 9.8 km || 
|-id=340 bgcolor=#d6d6d6
| 9340 Williamholden ||  ||  || June 6, 1991 || La Silla || E. W. Elst || THMslow || align=right | 15 km || 
|-id=341 bgcolor=#E9E9E9
| 9341 Gracekelly ||  ||  || August 2, 1991 || La Silla || E. W. Elst || — || align=right | 3.5 km || 
|-id=342 bgcolor=#fefefe
| 9342 Carygrant ||  ||  || August 6, 1991 || La Silla || E. W. Elst || FLO || align=right | 2.8 km || 
|-id=343 bgcolor=#fefefe
| 9343 ||  || — || August 9, 1991 || Palomar || H. E. Holt || V || align=right | 4.0 km || 
|-id=344 bgcolor=#fefefe
| 9344 Klopstock ||  ||  || September 12, 1991 || Tautenburg Observatory || F. Börngen, L. D. Schmadel || — || align=right | 17 km || 
|-id=345 bgcolor=#fefefe
| 9345 ||  || — || September 12, 1991 || Palomar || H. E. Holt || — || align=right | 3.2 km || 
|-id=346 bgcolor=#fefefe
| 9346 Fernandel ||  ||  || September 4, 1991 || La Silla || E. W. Elst || NYS || align=right | 4.7 km || 
|-id=347 bgcolor=#fefefe
| 9347 ||  || — || September 15, 1991 || Palomar || H. E. Holt || NYS || align=right | 5.2 km || 
|-id=348 bgcolor=#fefefe
| 9348 ||  || — || September 11, 1991 || Palomar || H. E. Holt || V || align=right | 4.0 km || 
|-id=349 bgcolor=#fefefe
| 9349 Lucas || 1991 SX ||  || September 30, 1991 || Siding Spring || R. H. McNaught || FLO || align=right | 1.8 km || 
|-id=350 bgcolor=#fefefe
| 9350 Waseda ||  ||  || October 13, 1991 || Nyukasa || M. Hirasawa, S. Suzuki || NYS || align=right | 3.3 km || 
|-id=351 bgcolor=#fefefe
| 9351 Neumayer ||  ||  || October 2, 1991 || Tautenburg Observatory || L. D. Schmadel, F. Börngen || — || align=right | 2.6 km || 
|-id=352 bgcolor=#E9E9E9
| 9352 ||  || — || October 31, 1991 || Kushiro || S. Ueda, H. Kaneda || — || align=right | 11 km || 
|-id=353 bgcolor=#fefefe
| 9353 ||  || — || November 9, 1991 || Dynic || A. Sugie || NYS || align=right | 3.2 km || 
|-id=354 bgcolor=#fefefe
| 9354 ||  || — || November 11, 1991 || Kushiro || S. Ueda, H. Kaneda || — || align=right | 5.5 km || 
|-id=355 bgcolor=#fefefe
| 9355 ||  || — || December 5, 1991 || Kushiro || S. Ueda, H. Kaneda || ERI || align=right | 6.4 km || 
|-id=356 bgcolor=#E9E9E9
| 9356 Elineke || 1991 YV ||  || December 30, 1991 || Haute-Provence || E. W. Elst || EUN || align=right | 8.0 km || 
|-id=357 bgcolor=#d6d6d6
| 9357 Venezuela ||  ||  || January 11, 1992 || Mérida || O. A. Naranjo || KOR || align=right | 6.8 km || 
|-id=358 bgcolor=#E9E9E9
| 9358 Fårö ||  ||  || February 29, 1992 || La Silla || UESAC || HEN || align=right | 5.7 km || 
|-id=359 bgcolor=#E9E9E9
| 9359 Fleringe ||  ||  || March 6, 1992 || La Silla || UESAC || — || align=right | 9.1 km || 
|-id=360 bgcolor=#d6d6d6
| 9360 ||  || — || March 2, 1992 || La Silla || UESAC || — || align=right | 4.5 km || 
|-id=361 bgcolor=#E9E9E9
| 9361 ||  || — || March 3, 1992 || La Silla || UESAC || — || align=right | 3.5 km || 
|-id=362 bgcolor=#E9E9E9
| 9362 Miyajima ||  ||  || March 23, 1992 || Kitami || K. Endate, K. Watanabe || fast? || align=right | 8.8 km || 
|-id=363 bgcolor=#E9E9E9
| 9363 || 1992 GR || — || April 3, 1992 || Kushiro || S. Ueda, H. Kaneda || EUN || align=right | 5.4 km || 
|-id=364 bgcolor=#E9E9E9
| 9364 Clusius ||  ||  || April 23, 1992 || La Silla || E. W. Elst || — || align=right | 12 km || 
|-id=365 bgcolor=#fefefe
| 9365 Chinesewilson ||  ||  || September 2, 1992 || La Silla || E. W. Elst || — || align=right | 3.7 km || 
|-id=366 bgcolor=#fefefe
| 9366 ||  || — || November 17, 1992 || Dynic || A. Sugie || — || align=right | 3.2 km || 
|-id=367 bgcolor=#fefefe
| 9367 ||  || — || January 30, 1993 || Yakiimo || A. Natori, T. Urata || — || align=right | 3.0 km || 
|-id=368 bgcolor=#fefefe
| 9368 Esashi ||  ||  || January 26, 1993 || Kagoshima || M. Mukai, M. Takeishi || — || align=right | 4.3 km || 
|-id=369 bgcolor=#fefefe
| 9369 ||  || — || February 20, 1993 || Okutama || T. Hioki, S. Hayakawa || EUT || align=right | 4.6 km || 
|-id=370 bgcolor=#fefefe
| 9370 ||  || — || March 21, 1993 || La Silla || UESAC || — || align=right | 4.9 km || 
|-id=371 bgcolor=#fefefe
| 9371 ||  || — || March 19, 1993 || La Silla || UESAC || — || align=right | 4.7 km || 
|-id=372 bgcolor=#d6d6d6
| 9372 Vamlingbo ||  ||  || March 19, 1993 || La Silla || UESAC || KOR || align=right | 5.1 km || 
|-id=373 bgcolor=#E9E9E9
| 9373 Hamra ||  ||  || March 19, 1993 || La Silla || UESAC || — || align=right | 3.3 km || 
|-id=374 bgcolor=#fefefe
| 9374 Sundre ||  ||  || March 19, 1993 || La Silla || UESAC || — || align=right | 2.4 km || 
|-id=375 bgcolor=#fefefe
| 9375 Omodaka || 1993 HK ||  || April 16, 1993 || Kitami || K. Endate, K. Watanabe || NYS || align=right | 3.9 km || 
|-id=376 bgcolor=#E9E9E9
| 9376 Thionville ||  ||  || July 20, 1993 || La Silla || E. W. Elst || — || align=right | 5.5 km || 
|-id=377 bgcolor=#d6d6d6
| 9377 Metz ||  ||  || August 15, 1993 || Caussols || E. W. Elst || — || align=right | 12 km || 
|-id=378 bgcolor=#d6d6d6
| 9378 Nancy-Lorraine ||  ||  || August 18, 1993 || Caussols || E. W. Elst || THM || align=right | 12 km || 
|-id=379 bgcolor=#d6d6d6
| 9379 Dijon ||  ||  || August 18, 1993 || Caussols || E. W. Elst || KOR || align=right | 6.0 km || 
|-id=380 bgcolor=#d6d6d6
| 9380 Mâcon ||  ||  || August 17, 1993 || Caussols || E. W. Elst || KOR || align=right | 5.7 km || 
|-id=381 bgcolor=#d6d6d6
| 9381 Lyon ||  ||  || September 15, 1993 || La Silla || H. Debehogne, E. W. Elst || — || align=right | 7.2 km || 
|-id=382 bgcolor=#fefefe
| 9382 Mihonoseki ||  ||  || October 11, 1993 || Kitami || K. Endate, K. Watanabe || — || align=right | 3.2 km || 
|-id=383 bgcolor=#d6d6d6
| 9383 Montélimar ||  ||  || October 9, 1993 || La Silla || E. W. Elst || THM || align=right | 7.4 km || 
|-id=384 bgcolor=#d6d6d6
| 9384 Aransio ||  ||  || October 9, 1993 || La Silla || E. W. Elst || — || align=right | 14 km || 
|-id=385 bgcolor=#d6d6d6
| 9385 Avignon ||  ||  || October 9, 1993 || La Silla || E. W. Elst || — || align=right | 13 km || 
|-id=386 bgcolor=#d6d6d6
| 9386 Hitomi ||  ||  || December 5, 1993 || Nyukasa || M. Hirasawa, S. Suzuki || — || align=right | 10 km || 
|-id=387 bgcolor=#fefefe
| 9387 Tweedledee || 1994 CA ||  || February 2, 1994 || Fujieda || H. Shiozawa, T. Urata || H || align=right | 4.6 km || 
|-id=388 bgcolor=#fefefe
| 9388 Takeno ||  ||  || March 10, 1994 || Oizumi || T. Kobayashi || — || align=right | 4.1 km || 
|-id=389 bgcolor=#fefefe
| 9389 Condillac ||  ||  || March 9, 1994 || Caussols || E. W. Elst || — || align=right | 2.7 km || 
|-id=390 bgcolor=#fefefe
| 9390 ||  || — || July 12, 1994 || Nachi-Katsuura || Y. Shimizu, T. Urata || NYS || align=right | 2.7 km || 
|-id=391 bgcolor=#E9E9E9
| 9391 Slee ||  ||  || August 14, 1994 || Siding Spring || R. H. McNaught || — || align=right | 8.8 km || 
|-id=392 bgcolor=#fefefe
| 9392 Cavaillon ||  ||  || August 10, 1994 || La Silla || E. W. Elst || V || align=right | 3.2 km || 
|-id=393 bgcolor=#E9E9E9
| 9393 Apta ||  ||  || August 10, 1994 || La Silla || E. W. Elst || — || align=right | 4.8 km || 
|-id=394 bgcolor=#E9E9E9
| 9394 Manosque ||  ||  || August 10, 1994 || La Silla || E. W. Elst || — || align=right | 6.3 km || 
|-id=395 bgcolor=#E9E9E9
| 9395 Saint Michel ||  ||  || August 10, 1994 || La Silla || E. W. Elst || — || align=right | 4.8 km || 
|-id=396 bgcolor=#d6d6d6
| 9396 Yamaneakisato || 1994 QT ||  || August 17, 1994 || Oizumi || T. Kobayashi || THM || align=right | 11 km || 
|-id=397 bgcolor=#E9E9E9
| 9397 Lombardi || 1994 RJ ||  || September 6, 1994 || Stroncone || Santa Lucia Obs. || — || align=right | 1.9 km || 
|-id=398 bgcolor=#d6d6d6
| 9398 Bidelman ||  ||  || September 28, 1994 || Kitt Peak || Spacewatch || 7:4 || align=right | 9.1 km || 
|-id=399 bgcolor=#E9E9E9
| 9399 Pesch ||  ||  || September 29, 1994 || Kitt Peak || Spacewatch || — || align=right | 4.4 km || 
|-id=400 bgcolor=#FFC2E0
| 9400 ||  || — || October 9, 1994 || Palomar || E. F. Helin, K. J. Lawrence || AMO +1km || align=right | 3.7 km || 
|}

9401–9500 

|-bgcolor=#E9E9E9
| 9401 ||  || — || October 13, 1994 || Nachi-Katsuura || Y. Shimizu, T. Urata || EUN || align=right | 5.8 km || 
|-id=402 bgcolor=#d6d6d6
| 9402 ||  || — || October 25, 1994 || Kushiro || S. Ueda, H. Kaneda || 7:4 || align=right | 20 km || 
|-id=403 bgcolor=#E9E9E9
| 9403 Sanduleak ||  ||  || October 31, 1994 || Kitt Peak || Spacewatch || — || align=right | 7.1 km || 
|-id=404 bgcolor=#E9E9E9
| 9404 ||  || — || October 26, 1994 || Kushiro || S. Ueda, H. Kaneda || NEM || align=right | 5.7 km || 
|-id=405 bgcolor=#d6d6d6
| 9405 Johnratje ||  ||  || November 27, 1994 || Oizumi || T. Kobayashi || KOR || align=right | 6.1 km || 
|-id=406 bgcolor=#E9E9E9
| 9406 ||  || — || November 28, 1994 || Kushiro || S. Ueda, H. Kaneda || — || align=right | 12 km || 
|-id=407 bgcolor=#E9E9E9
| 9407 Kimuranaoto ||  ||  || November 28, 1994 || Kiyosato || S. Otomo || — || align=right | 6.6 km || 
|-id=408 bgcolor=#d6d6d6
| 9408 Haseakira || 1995 BC ||  || January 20, 1995 || Oizumi || T. Kobayashi || KOR || align=right | 5.6 km || 
|-id=409 bgcolor=#d6d6d6
| 9409 Kanpuzan ||  ||  || January 25, 1995 || Geisei || T. Seki || — || align=right | 13 km || 
|-id=410 bgcolor=#d6d6d6
| 9410 ||  || — || January 26, 1995 || Oohira || T. Urata || THM || align=right | 17 km || 
|-id=411 bgcolor=#d6d6d6
| 9411 Hitomiyamoto || 1995 CF ||  || February 1, 1995 || Oizumi || T. Kobayashi || HYG || align=right | 11 km || 
|-id=412 bgcolor=#fefefe
| 9412 ||  || — || April 4, 1995 || Kushiro || S. Ueda, H. Kaneda || — || align=right | 4.9 km || 
|-id=413 bgcolor=#fefefe
| 9413 Eichendorff ||  ||  || September 21, 1995 || Tautenburg Observatory || F. Börngen || NYS || align=right | 5.8 km || 
|-id=414 bgcolor=#fefefe
| 9414 Masamimurakami ||  ||  || October 25, 1995 || Oizumi || T. Kobayashi || — || align=right | 12 km || 
|-id=415 bgcolor=#fefefe
| 9415 Yujiokimura || 1995 VE ||  || November 1, 1995 || Oizumi || T. Kobayashi || — || align=right | 2.4 km || 
|-id=416 bgcolor=#fefefe
| 9416 Miyahara || 1995 WS ||  || November 17, 1995 || Oizumi || T. Kobayashi || FLO || align=right | 2.5 km || 
|-id=417 bgcolor=#fefefe
| 9417 Jujiishii || 1995 WU ||  || November 17, 1995 || Oizumi || T. Kobayashi || — || align=right | 8.5 km || 
|-id=418 bgcolor=#fefefe
| 9418 Mayumi ||  ||  || November 18, 1995 || Chichibu || N. Satō, T. Urata || — || align=right | 3.3 km || 
|-id=419 bgcolor=#fefefe
| 9419 Keikochaki || 1995 XS ||  || December 12, 1995 || Oizumi || T. Kobayashi || FLO || align=right | 3.4 km || 
|-id=420 bgcolor=#fefefe
| 9420 Dewar ||  ||  || December 14, 1995 || Kitt Peak || Spacewatch || FLO || align=right | 3.2 km || 
|-id=421 bgcolor=#fefefe
| 9421 Violilla ||  ||  || December 24, 1995 || Church Stretton || S. P. Laurie || NYS || align=right | 2.4 km || 
|-id=422 bgcolor=#fefefe
| 9422 Kuboniwa ||  ||  || January 13, 1996 || Oizumi || T. Kobayashi || MAS || align=right | 4.6 km || 
|-id=423 bgcolor=#E9E9E9
| 9423 Abt ||  ||  || January 12, 1996 || Kitt Peak || Spacewatch || — || align=right | 13 km || 
|-id=424 bgcolor=#fefefe
| 9424 Hiroshinishiyama || 1996 BN ||  || January 16, 1996 || Oizumi || T. Kobayashi || MAS || align=right | 3.4 km || 
|-id=425 bgcolor=#fefefe
| 9425 Marconcini ||  ||  || February 14, 1996 || Asiago || M. Tombelli, U. Munari || — || align=right | 4.1 km || 
|-id=426 bgcolor=#d6d6d6
| 9426 Aliante ||  ||  || February 14, 1996 || Cima Ekar || U. Munari, M. Tombelli || KOR || align=right | 6.3 km || 
|-id=427 bgcolor=#d6d6d6
| 9427 Righini ||  ||  || February 14, 1996 || Cima Ekar || M. Tombelli, U. Munari || EOS || align=right | 8.4 km || 
|-id=428 bgcolor=#E9E9E9
| 9428 Angelalouise ||  ||  || February 26, 1996 || Church Stretton || S. P. Laurie || — || align=right | 14 km || 
|-id=429 bgcolor=#d6d6d6
| 9429 Poreč ||  ||  || March 14, 1996 || Višnjan Observatory || Višnjan Obs. || — || align=right | 8.1 km || 
|-id=430 bgcolor=#C2FFFF
| 9430 Erichthonios ||  ||  || April 17, 1996 || La Silla || E. W. Elst || L5 || align=right | 28 km || 
|-id=431 bgcolor=#C2FFFF
| 9431 Pytho ||  ||  || August 12, 1996 || Farra d'Isonzo || Farra d'Isonzo || L4 || align=right | 38 km || 
|-id=432 bgcolor=#fefefe
| 9432 Iba || 1997 CQ ||  || February 1, 1997 || Oizumi || T. Kobayashi || — || align=right | 3.5 km || 
|-id=433 bgcolor=#fefefe
| 9433 ||  || — || February 3, 1997 || Haleakalā || NEAT || — || align=right | 4.1 km || 
|-id=434 bgcolor=#fefefe
| 9434 Bokusen ||  ||  || February 12, 1997 || Oizumi || T. Kobayashi || — || align=right | 2.6 km || 
|-id=435 bgcolor=#fefefe
| 9435 Odafukashi ||  ||  || February 12, 1997 || Oizumi || T. Kobayashi || — || align=right | 3.3 km || 
|-id=436 bgcolor=#fefefe
| 9436 Shudo || 1997 EB ||  || March 1, 1997 || Oizumi || T. Kobayashi || NYS || align=right | 5.0 km || 
|-id=437 bgcolor=#fefefe
| 9437 Hironari ||  ||  || March 4, 1997 || Oizumi || T. Kobayashi || — || align=right | 4.0 km || 
|-id=438 bgcolor=#fefefe
| 9438 Satie ||  ||  || March 5, 1997 || Kitt Peak || Spacewatch || FLO || align=right | 2.5 km || 
|-id=439 bgcolor=#fefefe
| 9439 ||  || — || March 10, 1997 || Socorro || LINEAR || — || align=right | 3.9 km || 
|-id=440 bgcolor=#fefefe
| 9440 ||  || — || March 29, 1997 || Xinglong || SCAP || — || align=right | 3.4 km || 
|-id=441 bgcolor=#d6d6d6
| 9441 ||  || — || April 2, 1997 || Socorro || LINEAR || HYG || align=right | 8.7 km || 
|-id=442 bgcolor=#E9E9E9
| 9442 Beiligong ||  ||  || April 2, 1997 || Xinglong || SCAP || EUN || align=right | 6.7 km || 
|-id=443 bgcolor=#fefefe
| 9443 ||  || — || April 30, 1997 || Socorro || LINEAR || — || align=right | 2.9 km || 
|-id=444 bgcolor=#d6d6d6
| 9444 || 1997 JA || — || May 1, 1997 || Kleť || Kleť Obs. || THM || align=right | 14 km || 
|-id=445 bgcolor=#fefefe
| 9445 Charpentier ||  ||  || May 8, 1997 || Prescott || P. G. Comba || — || align=right | 2.7 km || 
|-id=446 bgcolor=#d6d6d6
| 9446 Cicero ||  ||  || May 3, 1997 || La Silla || E. W. Elst || THM || align=right | 13 km || 
|-id=447 bgcolor=#E9E9E9
| 9447 Julesbordet ||  ||  || May 3, 1997 || La Silla || E. W. Elst || GEF || align=right | 5.9 km || 
|-id=448 bgcolor=#E9E9E9
| 9448 Donaldavies ||  ||  || June 5, 1997 || Kitt Peak || Spacewatch || HEN || align=right | 4.0 km || 
|-id=449 bgcolor=#d6d6d6
| 9449 Petrbondy ||  ||  || November 4, 1997 || Ondřejov || L. Kotková || EOS || align=right | 11 km || 
|-id=450 bgcolor=#fefefe
| 9450 Akikoizumo ||  ||  || January 19, 1998 || Oizumi || T. Kobayashi || — || align=right | 3.4 km || 
|-id=451 bgcolor=#d6d6d6
| 9451 ||  || — || January 20, 1998 || Socorro || LINEAR || THM || align=right | 13 km || 
|-id=452 bgcolor=#E9E9E9
| 9452 Rogerpeeters ||  ||  || February 27, 1998 || La Silla || E. W. Elst || — || align=right | 6.6 km || 
|-id=453 bgcolor=#d6d6d6
| 9453 Mallorca ||  ||  || March 19, 1998 || Majorca || Á. López J., R. Pacheco || EOS || align=right | 8.0 km || 
|-id=454 bgcolor=#d6d6d6
| 9454 ||  || — || March 20, 1998 || Socorro || LINEAR || — || align=right | 6.7 km || 
|-id=455 bgcolor=#E9E9E9
| 9455 ||  || — || March 20, 1998 || Socorro || LINEAR || — || align=right | 12 km || 
|-id=456 bgcolor=#d6d6d6
| 9456 ||  || — || March 20, 1998 || Socorro || LINEAR || — || align=right | 6.4 km || 
|-id=457 bgcolor=#d6d6d6
| 9457 ||  || — || March 24, 1998 || Socorro || LINEAR || THM || align=right | 12 km || 
|-id=458 bgcolor=#E9E9E9
| 9458 ||  || — || March 31, 1998 || Socorro || LINEAR || — || align=right | 4.0 km || 
|-id=459 bgcolor=#fefefe
| 9459 ||  || — || March 31, 1998 || Socorro || LINEAR || FLO || align=right | 4.3 km || 
|-id=460 bgcolor=#E9E9E9
| 9460 McGlynn ||  ||  || April 29, 1998 || Haleakalā || NEAT || EUN || align=right | 8.1 km || 
|-id=461 bgcolor=#E9E9E9
| 9461 ||  || — || April 20, 1998 || Socorro || LINEAR || — || align=right | 4.5 km || 
|-id=462 bgcolor=#fefefe
| 9462 ||  || — || April 20, 1998 || Socorro || LINEAR || NYS || align=right | 3.6 km || 
|-id=463 bgcolor=#d6d6d6
| 9463 Criscione ||  ||  || April 20, 1998 || Socorro || LINEAR || KOR || align=right | 5.0 km || 
|-id=464 bgcolor=#d6d6d6
| 9464 ||  || — || April 23, 1998 || Socorro || LINEAR || — || align=right | 16 km || 
|-id=465 bgcolor=#d6d6d6
| 9465 ||  || — || April 23, 1998 || Socorro || LINEAR || — || align=right | 6.9 km || 
|-id=466 bgcolor=#fefefe
| 9466 Shishir ||  ||  || May 22, 1998 || Socorro || LINEAR || FLO || align=right | 3.3 km || 
|-id=467 bgcolor=#d6d6d6
| 9467 ||  || — || May 22, 1998 || Socorro || LINEAR || — || align=right | 10 km || 
|-id=468 bgcolor=#fefefe
| 9468 Brewer ||  ||  || June 1, 1998 || La Silla || E. W. Elst || — || align=right | 6.1 km || 
|-id=469 bgcolor=#fefefe
| 9469 Shashank ||  ||  || June 24, 1998 || Socorro || LINEAR || NYS || align=right | 2.0 km || 
|-id=470 bgcolor=#d6d6d6
| 9470 Jussieu ||  ||  || July 26, 1998 || La Silla || E. W. Elst || THM || align=right | 12 km || 
|-id=471 bgcolor=#E9E9E9
| 9471 Ostend ||  ||  || July 26, 1998 || La Silla || E. W. Elst || AGN || align=right | 5.7 km || 
|-id=472 bgcolor=#d6d6d6
| 9472 Bruges ||  ||  || July 26, 1998 || La Silla || E. W. Elst || THM || align=right | 8.1 km || 
|-id=473 bgcolor=#E9E9E9
| 9473 Ghent ||  ||  || July 26, 1998 || La Silla || E. W. Elst || — || align=right | 3.4 km || 
|-id=474 bgcolor=#fefefe
| 9474 Cassadrury ||  ||  || August 17, 1998 || Socorro || LINEAR || FLOmoon || align=right | 3.6 km || 
|-id=475 bgcolor=#d6d6d6
| 9475 ||  || — || August 17, 1998 || Socorro || LINEAR || — || align=right | 9.2 km || 
|-id=476 bgcolor=#fefefe
| 9476 ||  || — || August 17, 1998 || Socorro || LINEAR || SUL || align=right | 8.6 km || 
|-id=477 bgcolor=#fefefe
| 9477 Kefennell ||  ||  || August 17, 1998 || Socorro || LINEAR || — || align=right | 2.4 km || 
|-id=478 bgcolor=#d6d6d6
| 9478 Caldeyro || 2148 P-L ||  || September 24, 1960 || Palomar || PLS || HYG || align=right | 7.8 km || 
|-id=479 bgcolor=#E9E9E9
| 9479 Madresplazamayo || 2175 P-L ||  || September 26, 1960 || Palomar || PLS || — || align=right | 2.7 km || 
|-id=480 bgcolor=#d6d6d6
| 9480 Inti || 2553 P-L ||  || September 24, 1960 || Palomar || PLS || THM || align=right | 13 km || 
|-id=481 bgcolor=#fefefe
| 9481 Menchú || 2559 P-L ||  || September 24, 1960 || Palomar || PLS || — || align=right | 4.7 km || 
|-id=482 bgcolor=#fefefe
| 9482 Rubéndarío || 4065 P-L ||  || September 24, 1960 || Palomar || PLS || NYS || align=right | 1.8 km || 
|-id=483 bgcolor=#d6d6d6
| 9483 Chagas || 4121 P-L ||  || September 24, 1960 || Palomar || PLS || — || align=right | 11 km || 
|-id=484 bgcolor=#d6d6d6
| 9484 Wanambi || 4590 P-L ||  || September 24, 1960 || Palomar || PLS || — || align=right | 11 km || 
|-id=485 bgcolor=#E9E9E9
| 9485 Uluru || 6108 P-L ||  || September 24, 1960 || Palomar || PLS || — || align=right | 4.5 km || 
|-id=486 bgcolor=#fefefe
| 9486 Utemorrah || 6130 P-L ||  || September 24, 1960 || Palomar || PLS || — || align=right | 5.1 km || 
|-id=487 bgcolor=#d6d6d6
| 9487 Kupe || 7633 P-L ||  || October 17, 1960 || Palomar || PLS || KOR || align=right | 5.2 km || 
|-id=488 bgcolor=#fefefe
| 9488 Huia || 9523 P-L ||  || September 24, 1960 || Palomar || PLS || FLOslow || align=right | 3.6 km || 
|-id=489 bgcolor=#E9E9E9
| 9489 Tanemahuta || 1146 T-1 ||  || March 25, 1971 || Palomar || PLS || — || align=right | 3.4 km || 
|-id=490 bgcolor=#d6d6d6
| 9490 Gosemeijer || 1181 T-1 ||  || March 25, 1971 || Palomar || PLS || — || align=right | 7.6 km || 
|-id=491 bgcolor=#fefefe
| 9491 Thooft || 1205 T-1 ||  || March 25, 1971 || Palomar || PLS || FLO || align=right | 2.2 km || 
|-id=492 bgcolor=#fefefe
| 9492 Veltman || 2066 T-1 ||  || March 25, 1971 || Palomar || PLS || — || align=right | 2.8 km || 
|-id=493 bgcolor=#E9E9E9
| 9493 Enescu || 3100 T-1 ||  || March 26, 1971 || Palomar || PLS || RAF || align=right | 4.7 km || 
|-id=494 bgcolor=#fefefe
| 9494 Donici || 3212 T-1 ||  || March 26, 1971 || Palomar || PLS || — || align=right | 3.8 km || 
|-id=495 bgcolor=#fefefe
| 9495 Eminescu || 4177 T-1 ||  || March 26, 1971 || Palomar || PLS || FLO || align=right | 3.3 km || 
|-id=496 bgcolor=#d6d6d6
| 9496 Ockels || 4260 T-1 ||  || March 26, 1971 || Palomar || PLS || KOR || align=right | 5.5 km || 
|-id=497 bgcolor=#d6d6d6
| 9497 Dwingeloo || 1001 T-2 ||  || September 29, 1973 || Palomar || PLS || — || align=right | 5.5 km || 
|-id=498 bgcolor=#fefefe
| 9498 Westerbork || 1197 T-2 ||  || September 29, 1973 || Palomar || PLS || NYS || align=right | 1.7 km || 
|-id=499 bgcolor=#d6d6d6
| 9499 Excalibur || 1269 T-2 ||  || September 29, 1973 || Palomar || PLS || — || align=right | 5.1 km || 
|-id=500 bgcolor=#E9E9E9
| 9500 Camelot || 1281 T-2 ||  || September 29, 1973 || Palomar || PLS || — || align=right | 3.8 km || 
|}

9501–9600 

|-bgcolor=#E9E9E9
| 9501 Ywain || 2071 T-2 ||  || September 29, 1973 || Palomar || PLS || — || align=right | 5.8 km || 
|-id=502 bgcolor=#fefefe
| 9502 Gaimar || 2075 T-2 ||  || September 29, 1973 || Palomar || PLS || ERI || align=right | 5.4 km || 
|-id=503 bgcolor=#d6d6d6
| 9503 Agrawain || 2180 T-2 ||  || September 29, 1973 || Palomar || PLS || — || align=right | 14 km || 
|-id=504 bgcolor=#d6d6d6
| 9504 Lionel || 2224 T-2 ||  || September 29, 1973 || Palomar || PLS || KOR || align=right | 4.8 km || 
|-id=505 bgcolor=#d6d6d6
| 9505 Lohengrin || 4131 T-2 ||  || September 29, 1973 || Palomar || PLS || — || align=right | 8.6 km || 
|-id=506 bgcolor=#d6d6d6
| 9506 Telramund || 5200 T-2 ||  || September 25, 1973 || Palomar || PLS || TEL || align=right | 6.6 km || 
|-id=507 bgcolor=#fefefe
| 9507 Gottfried || 5447 T-2 ||  || September 30, 1973 || Palomar || PLS || — || align=right | 3.1 km || 
|-id=508 bgcolor=#fefefe
| 9508 Titurel || 3395 T-3 ||  || October 16, 1977 || Palomar || PLS || — || align=right | 4.1 km || 
|-id=509 bgcolor=#fefefe
| 9509 Amfortas || 3453 T-3 ||  || October 16, 1977 || Palomar || PLS || — || align=right | 3.3 km || 
|-id=510 bgcolor=#d6d6d6
| 9510 Gurnemanz || 5022 T-3 ||  || October 16, 1977 || Palomar || PLS || EOS || align=right | 6.4 km || 
|-id=511 bgcolor=#E9E9E9
| 9511 Klingsor || 5051 T-3 ||  || October 16, 1977 || Palomar || PLS || GEF || align=right | 6.4 km || 
|-id=512 bgcolor=#E9E9E9
| 9512 Feijunlong || 1966 CM ||  || February 13, 1966 || Nanking || Purple Mountain Obs. || EUN || align=right | 7.0 km || 
|-id=513 bgcolor=#fefefe
| 9513 || 1971 UN || — || October 26, 1971 || Hamburg-Bergedorf || L. Kohoutek || — || align=right | 10 km || 
|-id=514 bgcolor=#fefefe
| 9514 Deineka ||  ||  || September 27, 1973 || Nauchnij || L. V. Zhuravleva || — || align=right | 3.4 km || 
|-id=515 bgcolor=#fefefe
| 9515 Dubner ||  ||  || September 5, 1975 || El Leoncito || M. R. Cesco || PHO || align=right | 12 km || 
|-id=516 bgcolor=#d6d6d6
| 9516 Inasan ||  ||  || December 16, 1976 || Nauchnij || L. I. Chernykh || — || align=right | 11 km || 
|-id=517 bgcolor=#E9E9E9
| 9517 Niehaisheng ||  ||  || November 3, 1977 || Nanking || Purple Mountain Obs. || — || align=right | 7.2 km || 
|-id=518 bgcolor=#fefefe
| 9518 Robbynaish || 1978 GA ||  || April 7, 1978 || Harvard Observatory || Harvard Obs. || — || align=right | 3.8 km || 
|-id=519 bgcolor=#E9E9E9
| 9519 Jeffkeck ||  ||  || November 6, 1978 || Palomar || E. F. Helin, S. J. Bus || — || align=right | 5.0 km || 
|-id=520 bgcolor=#fefefe
| 9520 Montydibiasi ||  ||  || November 7, 1978 || Palomar || E. F. Helin, S. J. Bus || — || align=right | 2.7 km || 
|-id=521 bgcolor=#fefefe
| 9521 Martinhoffmann ||  ||  || March 16, 1980 || La Silla || C.-I. Lagerkvist || FLO || align=right | 2.9 km || 
|-id=522 bgcolor=#d6d6d6
| 9522 Schlichting || 1981 DS ||  || February 28, 1981 || Siding Spring || S. J. Bus || 7:4 || align=right | 17 km || 
|-id=523 bgcolor=#fefefe
| 9523 Torino ||  ||  || March 5, 1981 || La Silla || H. Debehogne, G. DeSanctis || NYS || align=right | 3.3 km || 
|-id=524 bgcolor=#fefefe
| 9524 O'Rourke ||  ||  || March 2, 1981 || Siding Spring || S. J. Bus || — || align=right | 2.9 km || 
|-id=525 bgcolor=#fefefe
| 9525 Amandasickafoose ||  ||  || March 1, 1981 || Siding Spring || S. J. Bus || — || align=right | 3.9 km || 
|-id=526 bgcolor=#d6d6d6
| 9526 Billmckinnon ||  ||  || March 1, 1981 || Siding Spring || S. J. Bus || — || align=right | 7.0 km || 
|-id=527 bgcolor=#fefefe
| 9527 Sherrypervan ||  ||  || March 3, 1981 || Siding Spring || S. J. Bus || — || align=right | 4.8 km || 
|-id=528 bgcolor=#d6d6d6
| 9528 Küppers ||  ||  || March 7, 1981 || Siding Spring || S. J. Bus || KOR || align=right | 3.5 km || 
|-id=529 bgcolor=#fefefe
| 9529 Protopapa ||  ||  || March 2, 1981 || Siding Spring || S. J. Bus || — || align=right | 2.4 km || 
|-id=530 bgcolor=#d6d6d6
| 9530 Kelleymichael ||  ||  || March 2, 1981 || Siding Spring || S. J. Bus || KOR || align=right | 5.1 km || 
|-id=531 bgcolor=#fefefe
| 9531 Jean-Luc || 1981 QK ||  || August 30, 1981 || Anderson Mesa || E. Bowell || FLO || align=right | 4.2 km || 
|-id=532 bgcolor=#E9E9E9
| 9532 Abramenko ||  ||  || September 7, 1981 || Nauchnij || L. G. Karachkina || — || align=right | 6.3 km || 
|-id=533 bgcolor=#E9E9E9
| 9533 Aleksejleonov ||  ||  || September 28, 1981 || Nauchnij || L. V. Zhuravleva || — || align=right | 9.6 km || 
|-id=534 bgcolor=#d6d6d6
| 9534 || 1981 TP || — || October 4, 1981 || Anderson Mesa || N. G. Thomas || THM || align=right | 10 km || 
|-id=535 bgcolor=#fefefe
| 9535 Plitchenko ||  ||  || October 22, 1981 || Nauchnij || N. S. Chernykh || NYS || align=right | 4.3 km || 
|-id=536 bgcolor=#E9E9E9
| 9536 Statler ||  ||  || October 24, 1981 || Palomar || S. J. Bus || EUN || align=right | 9.9 km || 
|-id=537 bgcolor=#E9E9E9
| 9537 Nolan || 1982 BM ||  || January 18, 1982 || Anderson Mesa || E. Bowell || — || align=right | 11 km || 
|-id=538 bgcolor=#E9E9E9
| 9538 ||  || — || October 20, 1982 || Kleť || A. Mrkos || — || align=right | 4.5 km || 
|-id=539 bgcolor=#d6d6d6
| 9539 Prishvin ||  ||  || October 21, 1982 || Nauchnij || L. G. Karachkina || THM || align=right | 9.6 km || 
|-id=540 bgcolor=#d6d6d6
| 9540 Mikhalkov ||  ||  || October 21, 1982 || Nauchnij || L. G. Karachkina || THM || align=right | 13 km || 
|-id=541 bgcolor=#fefefe
| 9541 Magri || 1983 CH ||  || February 11, 1983 || Anderson Mesa || E. Bowell || FLO || align=right | 4.4 km || 
|-id=542 bgcolor=#fefefe
| 9542 Eryan ||  ||  || October 12, 1983 || Anderson Mesa || E. Bowell || — || align=right | 6.0 km || 
|-id=543 bgcolor=#d6d6d6
| 9543 Nitra ||  ||  || December 4, 1983 || Piszkéstető || M. Antal || EOS || align=right | 9.9 km || 
|-id=544 bgcolor=#d6d6d6
| 9544 Scottbirney || 1984 EL ||  || March 1, 1984 || Anderson Mesa || E. Bowell || HYG || align=right | 15 km || 
|-id=545 bgcolor=#E9E9E9
| 9545 Petrovedomosti || 1984 MQ ||  || June 25, 1984 || Nauchnij || T. M. Smirnova || CLO || align=right | 9.5 km || 
|-id=546 bgcolor=#fefefe
| 9546 ||  || — || September 22, 1984 || La Silla || H. Debehogne || FLO || align=right | 3.9 km || 
|-id=547 bgcolor=#fefefe
| 9547 || 1985 AE || — || January 15, 1985 || Toyota || K. Suzuki, T. Urata || — || align=right | 7.9 km || 
|-id=548 bgcolor=#fefefe
| 9548 Fortran || 1985 CN ||  || February 13, 1985 || Kitt Peak || Spacewatch || — || align=right | 5.4 km || 
|-id=549 bgcolor=#E9E9E9
| 9549 Akplatonov ||  ||  || September 19, 1985 || Nauchnij || N. S. Chernykh, L. I. Chernykh || — || align=right | 8.2 km || 
|-id=550 bgcolor=#E9E9E9
| 9550 Victorblanco ||  ||  || October 15, 1985 || Anderson Mesa || E. Bowell || — || align=right | 13 km || 
|-id=551 bgcolor=#FA8072
| 9551 Kazi || 1985 UJ ||  || October 20, 1985 || Kleť || A. Mrkos || — || align=right | 4.3 km || 
|-id=552 bgcolor=#d6d6d6
| 9552 || 1985 UY || — || October 24, 1985 || Kleť || A. Mrkos || SYL7:4 || align=right | 17 km || 
|-id=553 bgcolor=#fefefe
| 9553 Colas ||  ||  || October 17, 1985 || Caussols || CERGA || — || align=right | 3.8 km || 
|-id=554 bgcolor=#fefefe
| 9554 Dumont || 1985 XA ||  || December 13, 1985 || Caussols || R. Chemin || H || align=right | 2.9 km || 
|-id=555 bgcolor=#fefefe
| 9555 Frejakocha || 1986 GC ||  || April 2, 1986 || Brorfelde || Copenhagen Obs. || V || align=right | 3.3 km || 
|-id=556 bgcolor=#fefefe
| 9556 Gaywray || 1986 GF ||  || April 8, 1986 || Palomar || INAS || PHOslow? || align=right | 6.0 km || 
|-id=557 bgcolor=#d6d6d6
| 9557 ||  || — || August 28, 1986 || La Silla || H. Debehogne || — || align=right | 12 km || 
|-id=558 bgcolor=#d6d6d6
| 9558 ||  || — || August 29, 1986 || La Silla || H. Debehogne || THM || align=right | 12 km || 
|-id=559 bgcolor=#E9E9E9
| 9559 ||  || — || February 23, 1987 || La Silla || H. Debehogne || slow || align=right | 14 km || 
|-id=560 bgcolor=#fefefe
| 9560 Anguita || 1987 EQ ||  || March 3, 1987 || Anderson Mesa || E. Bowell || — || align=right | 3.8 km || 
|-id=561 bgcolor=#fefefe
| 9561 van Eyck ||  ||  || August 19, 1987 || La Silla || E. W. Elst || — || align=right | 4.2 km || 
|-id=562 bgcolor=#d6d6d6
| 9562 Memling || 1987 RG ||  || September 1, 1987 || La Silla || E. W. Elst || — || align=right | 18 km || 
|-id=563 bgcolor=#fefefe
| 9563 Kitty ||  ||  || September 21, 1987 || Anderson Mesa || E. Bowell || NYS || align=right | 3.3 km || 
|-id=564 bgcolor=#FA8072
| 9564 Jeffwynn ||  ||  || September 26, 1987 || Palomar || C. S. Shoemaker, E. M. Shoemaker || — || align=right | 4.9 km || 
|-id=565 bgcolor=#fefefe
| 9565 Tikhonov ||  ||  || September 18, 1987 || Nauchnij || L. I. Chernykh || V || align=right | 4.5 km || 
|-id=566 bgcolor=#fefefe
| 9566 Rykhlova ||  ||  || September 18, 1987 || Nauchnij || L. I. Chernykh || ERI || align=right | 9.3 km || 
|-id=567 bgcolor=#fefefe
| 9567 Surgut ||  ||  || October 22, 1987 || Nauchnij || L. V. Zhuravleva || NYS || align=right | 6.0 km || 
|-id=568 bgcolor=#fefefe
| 9568 ||  || — || January 13, 1988 || La Silla || H. Debehogne || V || align=right | 3.5 km || 
|-id=569 bgcolor=#fefefe
| 9569 Quintenmatsijs ||  ||  || February 11, 1988 || La Silla || E. W. Elst || — || align=right | 4.5 km || 
|-id=570 bgcolor=#d6d6d6
| 9570 ||  || — || September 2, 1988 || La Silla || H. Debehogne || — || align=right | 8.1 km || 
|-id=571 bgcolor=#fefefe
| 9571 ||  || — || September 2, 1988 || La Silla || H. Debehogne || — || align=right | 3.0 km || 
|-id=572 bgcolor=#FA8072
| 9572 ||  || — || September 8, 1988 || La Silla || H. Debehogne || — || align=right | 2.1 km || 
|-id=573 bgcolor=#d6d6d6
| 9573 Matsumotomas || 1988 UC ||  || October 16, 1988 || Kitami || K. Endate, K. Watanabe || KOR || align=right | 6.8 km || 
|-id=574 bgcolor=#fefefe
| 9574 Taku ||  ||  || December 5, 1988 || Kiso || T. Nakamura || — || align=right | 4.3 km || 
|-id=575 bgcolor=#fefefe
| 9575 ||  || — || January 29, 1989 || Kleť || A. Mrkos || — || align=right | 3.1 km || 
|-id=576 bgcolor=#d6d6d6
| 9576 van der Weyden ||  ||  || February 4, 1989 || La Silla || E. W. Elst || EOS || align=right | 8.6 km || 
|-id=577 bgcolor=#fefefe
| 9577 Gropius ||  ||  || February 2, 1989 || Tautenburg Observatory || F. Börngen || NYS || align=right | 2.3 km || 
|-id=578 bgcolor=#fefefe
| 9578 Klyazma ||  ||  || April 3, 1989 || La Silla || E. W. Elst || NYS || align=right | 3.1 km || 
|-id=579 bgcolor=#fefefe
| 9579 Passchendaele ||  ||  || April 3, 1989 || La Silla || E. W. Elst || NYS || align=right | 8.7 km || 
|-id=580 bgcolor=#E9E9E9
| 9580 Tarumi ||  ||  || October 4, 1989 || Minami-Oda || T. Nomura, K. Kawanishi || — || align=right | 5.8 km || 
|-id=581 bgcolor=#fefefe
| 9581 ||  || — || February 24, 1990 || La Silla || H. Debehogne || FLO || align=right | 3.6 km || 
|-id=582 bgcolor=#fefefe
| 9582 ||  || — || March 3, 1990 || La Silla || H. Debehogne || — || align=right | 4.4 km || 
|-id=583 bgcolor=#fefefe
| 9583 Clerke ||  ||  || April 28, 1990 || Siding Spring || R. H. McNaught || — || align=right | 3.4 km || 
|-id=584 bgcolor=#fefefe
| 9584 Louchheim ||  ||  || July 25, 1990 || Palomar || H. E. Holt || slow || align=right | 4.4 km || 
|-id=585 bgcolor=#fefefe
| 9585 ||  || — || August 28, 1990 || Palomar || H. E. Holt || — || align=right | 4.5 km || 
|-id=586 bgcolor=#fefefe
| 9586 ||  || — || September 16, 1990 || Palomar || H. E. Holt || — || align=right | 3.4 km || 
|-id=587 bgcolor=#E9E9E9
| 9587 Bonpland ||  ||  || October 16, 1990 || La Silla || E. W. Elst || — || align=right | 4.8 km || 
|-id=588 bgcolor=#E9E9E9
| 9588 Quesnay ||  ||  || November 18, 1990 || La Silla || E. W. Elst || — || align=right | 4.6 km || 
|-id=589 bgcolor=#E9E9E9
| 9589 Deridder ||  ||  || November 21, 1990 || La Silla || E. W. Elst || — || align=right | 3.3 km || 
|-id=590 bgcolor=#C2FFFF
| 9590 Hyria ||  ||  || February 21, 1991 || Kitt Peak || Spacewatch || L4 || align=right | 22 km || 
|-id=591 bgcolor=#d6d6d6
| 9591 ||  || — || March 20, 1991 || La Silla || H. Debehogne || — || align=right | 9.5 km || 
|-id=592 bgcolor=#d6d6d6
| 9592 Clairaut ||  ||  || April 8, 1991 || La Silla || E. W. Elst || KOR || align=right | 6.5 km || 
|-id=593 bgcolor=#fefefe
| 9593 ||  || — || August 7, 1991 || Palomar || H. E. Holt || FLO || align=right | 3.4 km || 
|-id=594 bgcolor=#fefefe
| 9594 Garstang || 1991 RG ||  || September 4, 1991 || Siding Spring || R. H. McNaught || FLO || align=right | 4.1 km || 
|-id=595 bgcolor=#fefefe
| 9595 ||  || — || September 13, 1991 || Palomar || H. E. Holt || FLO || align=right | 4.4 km || 
|-id=596 bgcolor=#fefefe
| 9596 ||  || — || September 15, 1991 || Palomar || H. E. Holt || — || align=right | 3.0 km || 
|-id=597 bgcolor=#fefefe
| 9597 || 1991 UF || — || October 18, 1991 || Kushiro || S. Ueda, H. Kaneda || — || align=right | 3.8 km || 
|-id=598 bgcolor=#fefefe
| 9598 || 1991 UQ || — || October 18, 1991 || Kushiro || S. Ueda, H. Kaneda || — || align=right | 3.3 km || 
|-id=599 bgcolor=#fefefe
| 9599 Onotomoko ||  ||  || October 29, 1991 || Kitami || K. Endate, K. Watanabe || — || align=right | 4.3 km || 
|-id=600 bgcolor=#fefefe
| 9600 ||  || — || October 31, 1991 || Kushiro || S. Ueda, H. Kaneda || — || align=right | 2.8 km || 
|}

9601–9700 

|-bgcolor=#fefefe
| 9601 ||  || — || October 18, 1991 || Kushiro || S. Ueda, H. Kaneda || FLO || align=right | 4.7 km || 
|-id=602 bgcolor=#fefefe
| 9602 Oya ||  ||  || October 31, 1991 || Kitami || T. Fujii, K. Watanabe || — || align=right | 5.4 km || 
|-id=603 bgcolor=#fefefe
| 9603 ||  || — || November 9, 1991 || Kushiro || S. Ueda, H. Kaneda || NYS || align=right | 2.6 km || 
|-id=604 bgcolor=#fefefe
| 9604 Bellevanzuylen || 1991 YW ||  || December 30, 1991 || Haute-Provence || E. W. Elst || — || align=right | 3.9 km || 
|-id=605 bgcolor=#fefefe
| 9605 ||  || — || January 11, 1992 || Mérida || O. A. Naranjo || — || align=right | 3.4 km || 
|-id=606 bgcolor=#fefefe
| 9606 || 1992 BZ || — || January 28, 1992 || Kushiro || S. Ueda, H. Kaneda || NYS || align=right | 5.3 km || 
|-id=607 bgcolor=#E9E9E9
| 9607 ||  || — || February 29, 1992 || La Silla || UESAC || CLO || align=right | 9.2 km || 
|-id=608 bgcolor=#d6d6d6
| 9608 ||  || — || August 2, 1992 || Palomar || H. E. Holt || — || align=right | 10 km || 
|-id=609 bgcolor=#d6d6d6
| 9609 Ponomarevalya ||  ||  || August 26, 1992 || Nauchnij || L. I. Chernykh || EOS || align=right | 12 km || 
|-id=610 bgcolor=#d6d6d6
| 9610 Vischer || 1992 RQ ||  || September 2, 1992 || Tautenburg Observatory || F. Börngen, L. D. Schmadel || — || align=right | 11 km || 
|-id=611 bgcolor=#d6d6d6
| 9611 Anouck ||  ||  || September 2, 1992 || La Silla || E. W. Elst || — || align=right | 13 km || 
|-id=612 bgcolor=#d6d6d6
| 9612 Belgorod ||  ||  || September 4, 1992 || Nauchnij || L. V. Zhuravleva || — || align=right | 7.6 km || 
|-id=613 bgcolor=#fefefe
| 9613 ||  || — || January 26, 1993 || Kitt Peak || T. J. Balonek || V || align=right | 2.3 km || 
|-id=614 bgcolor=#fefefe
| 9614 Cuvier ||  ||  || January 27, 1993 || Caussols || E. W. Elst || — || align=right | 3.2 km || 
|-id=615 bgcolor=#fefefe
| 9615 Hemerijckx ||  ||  || January 23, 1993 || La Silla || E. W. Elst || FLO || align=right | 3.9 km || 
|-id=616 bgcolor=#fefefe
| 9616 ||  || — || March 21, 1993 || Palomar || E. F. Helin || V || align=right | 2.9 km || 
|-id=617 bgcolor=#fefefe
| 9617 Grahamchapman ||  ||  || March 17, 1993 || La Silla || UESAC || FLOmoon || align=right | 2.8 km || 
|-id=618 bgcolor=#fefefe
| 9618 Johncleese ||  ||  || March 17, 1993 || La Silla || UESAC || V || align=right | 2.0 km || 
|-id=619 bgcolor=#fefefe
| 9619 Terrygilliam ||  ||  || March 17, 1993 || La Silla || UESAC || ERI || align=right | 6.6 km || 
|-id=620 bgcolor=#fefefe
| 9620 Ericidle ||  ||  || March 17, 1993 || La Silla || UESAC || — || align=right | 3.5 km || 
|-id=621 bgcolor=#fefefe
| 9621 Michaelpalin ||  ||  || March 21, 1993 || La Silla || UESAC || — || align=right | 3.6 km || 
|-id=622 bgcolor=#fefefe
| 9622 Terryjones ||  ||  || March 21, 1993 || La Silla || UESAC || — || align=right | 3.2 km || 
|-id=623 bgcolor=#fefefe
| 9623 Karlsson ||  ||  || March 21, 1993 || La Silla || UESAC || — || align=right | 4.2 km || 
|-id=624 bgcolor=#fefefe
| 9624 ||  || — || March 19, 1993 || La Silla || UESAC || NYS || align=right | 6.1 km || 
|-id=625 bgcolor=#E9E9E9
| 9625 || 1993 HF || — || April 16, 1993 || Kushiro || S. Ueda, H. Kaneda || — || align=right | 6.5 km || 
|-id=626 bgcolor=#fefefe
| 9626 Stanley ||  ||  || May 14, 1993 || La Silla || E. W. Elst || NYS || align=right | 3.6 km || 
|-id=627 bgcolor=#E9E9E9
| 9627 ||  || — || June 15, 1993 || Palomar || H. E. Holt || EUN || align=right | 5.4 km || 
|-id=628 bgcolor=#E9E9E9
| 9628 Sendaiotsuna ||  ||  || July 16, 1993 || Palomar || E. F. Helin || EUN || align=right | 8.4 km || 
|-id=629 bgcolor=#E9E9E9
| 9629 Servet ||  ||  || August 15, 1993 || Caussols || E. W. Elst || HEN || align=right | 5.7 km || 
|-id=630 bgcolor=#E9E9E9
| 9630 Castellion ||  ||  || August 15, 1993 || Caussols || E. W. Elst || — || align=right | 6.8 km || 
|-id=631 bgcolor=#d6d6d6
| 9631 Hubertreeves ||  ||  || September 17, 1993 || La Silla || E. W. Elst || KOR || align=right | 6.2 km || 
|-id=632 bgcolor=#d6d6d6
| 9632 Sudo ||  ||  || October 15, 1993 || Kitami || K. Endate, K. Watanabe || — || align=right | 7.0 km || 
|-id=633 bgcolor=#d6d6d6
| 9633 Cotur ||  ||  || October 20, 1993 || La Silla || E. W. Elst || — || align=right | 10 km || 
|-id=634 bgcolor=#d6d6d6
| 9634 Vodice || 1993 XB ||  || December 4, 1993 || Farra d'Isonzo || Farra d'Isonzo || — || align=right | 6.1 km || 
|-id=635 bgcolor=#d6d6d6
| 9635 || 1993 XS || — || December 9, 1993 || Oohira || T. Urata || — || align=right | 7.9 km || 
|-id=636 bgcolor=#d6d6d6
| 9636 Emanuelaspessot || 1993 YO ||  || December 17, 1993 || Farra d'Isonzo || Farra d'Isonzo || — || align=right | 11 km || 
|-id=637 bgcolor=#fefefe
| 9637 Perryrose ||  ||  || August 9, 1994 || Palomar || Palomar Obs. || — || align=right | 3.3 km || 
|-id=638 bgcolor=#fefefe
| 9638 Fuchs ||  ||  || August 10, 1994 || La Silla || E. W. Elst || EUT || align=right | 3.0 km || 
|-id=639 bgcolor=#fefefe
| 9639 Scherer ||  ||  || August 10, 1994 || La Silla || E. W. Elst || — || align=right | 5.1 km || 
|-id=640 bgcolor=#fefefe
| 9640 Lippens ||  ||  || August 12, 1994 || La Silla || E. W. Elst || NYS || align=right | 3.3 km || 
|-id=641 bgcolor=#fefefe
| 9641 Demazière ||  ||  || August 12, 1994 || La Silla || E. W. Elst || — || align=right | 3.5 km || 
|-id=642 bgcolor=#fefefe
| 9642 Takatahiro || 1994 RU ||  || September 1, 1994 || Kitami || K. Endate, K. Watanabe || NYS || align=right | 3.1 km || 
|-id=643 bgcolor=#fefefe
| 9643 || 1994 RX || — || September 2, 1994 || Nachi-Katsuura || Y. Shimizu, T. Urata || — || align=right | 5.2 km || 
|-id=644 bgcolor=#d6d6d6
| 9644 ||  || — || November 26, 1994 || Nachi-Katsuura || Y. Shimizu, T. Urata || — || align=right | 8.0 km || 
|-id=645 bgcolor=#E9E9E9
| 9645 Grünewald ||  ||  || January 5, 1995 || Tautenburg Observatory || F. Börngen || — || align=right | 10 km || 
|-id=646 bgcolor=#d6d6d6
| 9646 || 1995 BV || — || January 25, 1995 || Oizumi || T. Kobayashi || THM || align=right | 12 km || 
|-id=647 bgcolor=#fefefe
| 9647 ||  || — || October 27, 1995 || Oizumi || T. Kobayashi || FLO || align=right | 2.0 km || 
|-id=648 bgcolor=#fefefe
| 9648 Gotouhideo ||  ||  || October 30, 1995 || Kashihara || F. Uto || FLO || align=right | 3.7 km || 
|-id=649 bgcolor=#fefefe
| 9649 Junfukue || 1995 XG ||  || December 2, 1995 || Oizumi || T. Kobayashi || — || align=right | 3.0 km || 
|-id=650 bgcolor=#fefefe
| 9650 Okadaira || 1995 YG ||  || December 17, 1995 || Oizumi || T. Kobayashi || NYS || align=right | 3.7 km || 
|-id=651 bgcolor=#fefefe
| 9651 Arii-SooHoo || 1996 AJ ||  || January 7, 1996 || Haleakalā || AMOS || NYS || align=right | 2.9 km || 
|-id=652 bgcolor=#fefefe
| 9652 ||  || — || January 12, 1996 || Kushiro || S. Ueda, H. Kaneda || — || align=right | 6.4 km || 
|-id=653 bgcolor=#E9E9E9
| 9653 ||  || — || January 13, 1996 || Oohira || T. Urata || EUN || align=right | 6.0 km || 
|-id=654 bgcolor=#fefefe
| 9654 Seitennokai ||  ||  || January 13, 1996 || Oizumi || T. Kobayashi || EUT || align=right | 2.4 km || 
|-id=655 bgcolor=#fefefe
| 9655 Yaburanger ||  ||  || February 11, 1996 || Oizumi || T. Kobayashi || — || align=right | 3.4 km || 
|-id=656 bgcolor=#fefefe
| 9656 ||  || — || February 23, 1996 || Oizumi || T. Kobayashi || — || align=right | 7.9 km || 
|-id=657 bgcolor=#d6d6d6
| 9657 Učka ||  ||  || February 24, 1996 || Višnjan Observatory || K. Korlević, D. Matković || — || align=right | 14 km || 
|-id=658 bgcolor=#fefefe
| 9658 Imabari ||  ||  || February 28, 1996 || Kuma Kogen || A. Nakamura || — || align=right | 2.8 km || 
|-id=659 bgcolor=#E9E9E9
| 9659 || 1996 EJ || — || March 10, 1996 || Kushiro || S. Ueda, H. Kaneda || EUN || align=right | 8.9 km || 
|-id=660 bgcolor=#d6d6d6
| 9660 ||  || — || March 22, 1996 || Haleakalā || NEAT || THM || align=right | 14 km || 
|-id=661 bgcolor=#d6d6d6
| 9661 Hohmann ||  ||  || March 18, 1996 || Kitt Peak || Spacewatch || 3:2 || align=right | 28 km || 
|-id=662 bgcolor=#E9E9E9
| 9662 Frankhubbard || 1996 GS ||  || April 12, 1996 || Prescott || P. G. Comba || GEF || align=right | 4.9 km || 
|-id=663 bgcolor=#E9E9E9
| 9663 Zwin ||  ||  || April 15, 1996 || La Silla || E. W. Elst || — || align=right | 3.7 km || 
|-id=664 bgcolor=#d6d6d6
| 9664 Brueghel ||  ||  || April 17, 1996 || La Silla || E. W. Elst || THM || align=right | 12 km || 
|-id=665 bgcolor=#d6d6d6
| 9665 Inastronoviny || 1996 LA ||  || June 5, 1996 || Kleť || Kleť Obs. || — || align=right | 9.5 km || 
|-id=666 bgcolor=#E9E9E9
| 9666 ||  || — || April 6, 1997 || Socorro || LINEAR || — || align=right | 6.6 km || 
|-id=667 bgcolor=#fefefe
| 9667 Amastrinc ||  ||  || April 29, 1997 || Kitt Peak || Spacewatch || NYS || align=right | 7.4 km || 
|-id=668 bgcolor=#E9E9E9
| 9668 Tianyahaijiao || 1997 LN ||  || June 3, 1997 || Xinglong || SCAP || — || align=right | 4.3 km || 
|-id=669 bgcolor=#d6d6d6
| 9669 Symmetria ||  ||  || July 8, 1997 || Prescott || P. G. Comba || THM || align=right | 11 km || 
|-id=670 bgcolor=#d6d6d6
| 9670 Magni ||  ||  || July 10, 1997 || Campo Imperatore || A. Boattini || EOS || align=right | 13 km || 
|-id=671 bgcolor=#FA8072
| 9671 Hemera ||  ||  || October 5, 1997 || Ondřejov || L. Kotková || — || align=right | 6.8 km || 
|-id=672 bgcolor=#d6d6d6
| 9672 Rosenbergerezek ||  ||  || October 5, 1997 || Ondřejov || P. Pravec || — || align=right | 14 km || 
|-id=673 bgcolor=#fefefe
| 9673 Kunishimakoto ||  ||  || October 25, 1997 || Kiyosato || S. Otomo || FLO || align=right | 3.5 km || 
|-id=674 bgcolor=#E9E9E9
| 9674 Slovenija ||  ||  || August 23, 1998 || Črni Vrh || Črni Vrh || RAF || align=right | 4.5 km || 
|-id=675 bgcolor=#d6d6d6
| 9675 ||  || — || August 17, 1998 || Socorro || LINEAR || — || align=right | 13 km || 
|-id=676 bgcolor=#d6d6d6
| 9676 Eijkman || 2023 P-L ||  || September 24, 1960 || Palomar || PLS || THM || align=right | 10 km || 
|-id=677 bgcolor=#d6d6d6
| 9677 Gowlandhopkins || 2532 P-L ||  || September 24, 1960 || Palomar || PLS || — || align=right | 9.6 km || 
|-id=678 bgcolor=#E9E9E9
| 9678 van der Meer || 2584 P-L ||  || September 24, 1960 || Palomar || PLS || — || align=right | 2.7 km || 
|-id=679 bgcolor=#fefefe
| 9679 Crutzen || 2600 P-L ||  || September 24, 1960 || Palomar || PLS || — || align=right | 1.9 km || 
|-id=680 bgcolor=#fefefe
| 9680 Molina || 3557 P-L ||  || October 22, 1960 || Palomar || PLS || FLO || align=right | 4.4 km || 
|-id=681 bgcolor=#d6d6d6
| 9681 Sherwoodrowland || 4069 P-L ||  || September 24, 1960 || Palomar || PLS || EOS || align=right | 7.3 km || 
|-id=682 bgcolor=#fefefe
| 9682 Gravesande || 4073 P-L ||  || September 24, 1960 || Palomar || PLS || — || align=right | 2.3 km || 
|-id=683 bgcolor=#fefefe
| 9683 Rambaldo || 4099 P-L ||  || September 24, 1960 || Palomar || PLS || FLO || align=right | 2.9 km || 
|-id=684 bgcolor=#fefefe
| 9684 Olieslagers || 4113 P-L ||  || September 24, 1960 || Palomar || PLS || NYS || align=right | 3.5 km || 
|-id=685 bgcolor=#fefefe
| 9685 Korteweg || 4247 P-L ||  || September 24, 1960 || Palomar || PLS || NYS || align=right | 3.1 km || 
|-id=686 bgcolor=#fefefe
| 9686 Keesom || 4604 P-L ||  || September 24, 1960 || Palomar || PLS || — || align=right | 2.3 km || 
|-id=687 bgcolor=#E9E9E9
| 9687 Uhlenbeck || 4614 P-L ||  || September 24, 1960 || Palomar || PLS || — || align=right | 5.4 km || 
|-id=688 bgcolor=#fefefe
| 9688 Goudsmit || 4665 P-L ||  || September 24, 1960 || Palomar || PLS || — || align=right | 5.2 km || 
|-id=689 bgcolor=#E9E9E9
| 9689 Freudenthal || 4831 P-L ||  || September 24, 1960 || Palomar || PLS || — || align=right | 3.7 km || 
|-id=690 bgcolor=#E9E9E9
| 9690 Houtgast || 6039 P-L ||  || September 24, 1960 || Palomar || PLS || — || align=right | 6.5 km || 
|-id=691 bgcolor=#E9E9E9
| 9691 Zwaan || 6053 P-L ||  || September 24, 1960 || Palomar || PLS || — || align=right | 6.6 km || 
|-id=692 bgcolor=#fefefe
| 9692 Kuperus || 6354 P-L ||  || September 24, 1960 || Palomar || PLS || NYS || align=right | 1.2 km || 
|-id=693 bgcolor=#fefefe
| 9693 Bleeker || 6547 P-L ||  || September 24, 1960 || Palomar || PLS || NYS || align=right | 3.5 km || 
|-id=694 bgcolor=#C2FFFF
| 9694 Lycomedes || 6581 P-L ||  || September 26, 1960 || Palomar || PLS || L4 || align=right | 32 km || 
|-id=695 bgcolor=#fefefe
| 9695 Johnheise || 6583 P-L ||  || September 24, 1960 || Palomar || PLS || FLO || align=right | 3.2 km || 
|-id=696 bgcolor=#fefefe
| 9696 Jaffe || 6628 P-L ||  || September 24, 1960 || Palomar || PLS || MAS || align=right | 2.2 km || 
|-id=697 bgcolor=#d6d6d6
| 9697 Louwman || 1295 T-1 ||  || March 25, 1971 || Palomar || PLS || CHA || align=right | 5.3 km || 
|-id=698 bgcolor=#fefefe
| 9698 Idzerda || 2205 T-1 ||  || March 25, 1971 || Palomar || PLS || V || align=right | 4.0 km || 
|-id=699 bgcolor=#E9E9E9
| 9699 Baumhauer || 3036 T-1 ||  || March 26, 1971 || Palomar || PLS || — || align=right | 9.2 km || 
|-id=700 bgcolor=#fefefe
| 9700 Paech || 3058 T-1 ||  || March 26, 1971 || Palomar || PLS || — || align=right | 2.6 km || 
|}

9701–9800 

|-bgcolor=#fefefe
| 9701 Mak || 1157 T-2 ||  || September 29, 1973 || Palomar || PLS || — || align=right | 5.2 km || 
|-id=702 bgcolor=#fefefe
| 9702 Tomvandijk || 2108 T-2 ||  || September 29, 1973 || Palomar || PLS || — || align=right | 2.7 km || 
|-id=703 bgcolor=#fefefe
| 9703 Sussenbach || 3146 T-2 ||  || September 30, 1973 || Palomar || PLS || — || align=right | 2.0 km || 
|-id=704 bgcolor=#fefefe
| 9704 Georgebeekman || 5469 T-2 ||  || September 30, 1973 || Palomar || PLS || — || align=right | 5.7 km || 
|-id=705 bgcolor=#d6d6d6
| 9705 Drummen || 3137 T-3 ||  || October 16, 1977 || Palomar || PLS || — || align=right | 9.3 km || 
|-id=706 bgcolor=#d6d6d6
| 9706 Bouma || 3176 T-3 ||  || October 16, 1977 || Palomar || PLS || — || align=right | 12 km || 
|-id=707 bgcolor=#E9E9E9
| 9707 Petruskoning || 3226 T-3 ||  || October 16, 1977 || Palomar || PLS || — || align=right | 9.3 km || 
|-id=708 bgcolor=#E9E9E9
| 9708 Gouka || 4140 T-3 ||  || October 16, 1977 || Palomar || PLS || — || align=right | 4.9 km || 
|-id=709 bgcolor=#d6d6d6
| 9709 Chrisnell || 5192 T-3 ||  || October 16, 1977 || Palomar || PLS || — || align=right | 9.7 km || 
|-id=710 bgcolor=#fefefe
| 9710 ||  || — || November 9, 1964 || Nanking || Purple Mountain Obs. || — || align=right | 2.6 km || 
|-id=711 bgcolor=#d6d6d6
| 9711 Želetava || 1972 PA ||  || August 7, 1972 || Zimmerwald || P. Wild, I. Baueršíma || EOS || align=right | 12 km || 
|-id=712 bgcolor=#C2FFFF
| 9712 Nauplius ||  ||  || September 19, 1973 || Palomar || PLS || L4 || align=right | 33 km || 
|-id=713 bgcolor=#C2FFFF
| 9713 Oceax ||  ||  || September 19, 1973 || Palomar || PLS || L4 || align=right | 19 km || 
|-id=714 bgcolor=#d6d6d6
| 9714 Piazzismyth ||  ||  || June 1, 1975 || Siding Spring || R. H. McNaught || — || align=right | 22 km || 
|-id=715 bgcolor=#d6d6d6
| 9715 Paolotanga ||  ||  || September 30, 1975 || Palomar || S. J. Bus || VER || align=right | 11 km || 
|-id=716 bgcolor=#fefefe
| 9716 Severina || 1975 UE ||  || October 27, 1975 || Zimmerwald || P. Wild || NYS || align=right | 5.2 km || 
|-id=717 bgcolor=#fefefe
| 9717 Lyudvasilia ||  ||  || September 24, 1976 || Nauchnij || N. S. Chernykh || V || align=right | 4.9 km || 
|-id=718 bgcolor=#fefefe
| 9718 Gerbefremov ||  ||  || December 16, 1976 || Nauchnij || L. I. Chernykh || — || align=right | 2.6 km || 
|-id=719 bgcolor=#E9E9E9
| 9719 Yakage ||  ||  || February 18, 1977 || Kiso || H. Kosai, K. Furukawa || — || align=right | 13 km || 
|-id=720 bgcolor=#d6d6d6
| 9720 Ulfbirgitta ||  ||  || March 16, 1980 || La Silla || C.-I. Lagerkvist || — || align=right | 5.5 km || 
|-id=721 bgcolor=#fefefe
| 9721 Doty || 1980 GB ||  || April 14, 1980 || Anderson Mesa || E. Bowell || — || align=right | 3.9 km || 
|-id=722 bgcolor=#fefefe
| 9722 Levi-Montalcini || 1981 EZ ||  || March 4, 1981 || La Silla || H. Debehogne, G. DeSanctis || — || align=right | 3.2 km || 
|-id=723 bgcolor=#fefefe
| 9723 Binyang ||  ||  || March 1, 1981 || Siding Spring || S. J. Bus || — || align=right | 3.7 km || 
|-id=724 bgcolor=#fefefe
| 9724 Villanueva ||  ||  || March 2, 1981 || Siding Spring || S. J. Bus || NYS || align=right | 2.7 km || 
|-id=725 bgcolor=#fefefe
| 9725 Wainscoat ||  ||  || March 2, 1981 || Siding Spring || S. J. Bus || NYS || align=right | 2.2 km || 
|-id=726 bgcolor=#d6d6d6
| 9726 Verbiscer ||  ||  || March 2, 1981 || Siding Spring || S. J. Bus || KOR || align=right | 4.0 km || 
|-id=727 bgcolor=#d6d6d6
| 9727 Skrutskie ||  ||  || March 2, 1981 || Siding Spring || S. J. Bus || KOR || align=right | 6.4 km || 
|-id=728 bgcolor=#fefefe
| 9728 Videen ||  ||  || March 2, 1981 || Siding Spring || S. J. Bus || — || align=right | 3.4 km || 
|-id=729 bgcolor=#E9E9E9
| 9729 || 1981 RQ || — || September 7, 1981 || Kleť || A. Mrkos || EUN || align=right | 5.7 km || 
|-id=730 bgcolor=#fefefe
| 9730 || 1982 FA || — || March 23, 1982 || Mount Lemmon || M. L. Sitko, W. A. Stein || — || align=right | 4.0 km || 
|-id=731 bgcolor=#fefefe
| 9731 ||  || — || May 15, 1982 || Palomar || Palomar Obs. || — || align=right | 4.5 km || 
|-id=732 bgcolor=#fefefe
| 9732 Juchnovski ||  ||  || September 24, 1984 || Smolyan || V. G. Shkodrov, V. G. Ivanova || — || align=right | 4.7 km || 
|-id=733 bgcolor=#fefefe
| 9733 Valtikhonov ||  ||  || September 19, 1985 || Nauchnij || N. S. Chernykh, L. I. Chernykh || — || align=right | 2.2 km || 
|-id=734 bgcolor=#fefefe
| 9734 ||  || — || February 12, 1986 || La Silla || H. Debehogne || FLO || align=right | 4.0 km || 
|-id=735 bgcolor=#fefefe
| 9735 || 1986 JD || — || May 2, 1986 || Palomar || INAS || — || align=right | 6.2 km || 
|-id=736 bgcolor=#d6d6d6
| 9736 ||  || — || August 28, 1986 || La Silla || H. Debehogne || THM || align=right | 9.0 km || 
|-id=737 bgcolor=#fefefe
| 9737 Dudarova ||  ||  || September 29, 1986 || Nauchnij || L. G. Karachkina || — || align=right | 4.9 km || 
|-id=738 bgcolor=#E9E9E9
| 9738 ||  || — || February 23, 1987 || La Silla || H. Debehogne || EUN || align=right | 6.5 km || 
|-id=739 bgcolor=#fefefe
| 9739 Powell ||  ||  || September 26, 1987 || Palomar || C. S. Shoemaker || Hslow || align=right | 2.7 km || 
|-id=740 bgcolor=#fefefe
| 9740 ||  || — || September 23, 1987 || La Silla || H. Debehogne || — || align=right | 7.7 km || 
|-id=741 bgcolor=#fefefe
| 9741 Solokhin ||  ||  || October 22, 1987 || Nauchnij || L. V. Zhuravleva || — || align=right | 4.7 km || 
|-id=742 bgcolor=#d6d6d6
| 9742 Worpswede ||  ||  || November 26, 1987 || Tautenburg Observatory || F. Börngen || — || align=right | 15 km || 
|-id=743 bgcolor=#fefefe
| 9743 Tohru || 1988 GD ||  || April 8, 1988 || Palomar || E. F. Helin || — || align=right | 4.7 km || 
|-id=744 bgcolor=#E9E9E9
| 9744 Nielsen || 1988 JW ||  || May 9, 1988 || Palomar || C. S. Shoemaker, E. M. Shoemaker || — || align=right | 4.7 km || 
|-id=745 bgcolor=#d6d6d6
| 9745 Shinkenwada || 1988 VY ||  || November 2, 1988 || Geisei || T. Seki || KOR || align=right | 5.3 km || 
|-id=746 bgcolor=#fefefe
| 9746 Kazukoichikawa ||  ||  || November 7, 1988 || Yatsugatake || Y. Kushida, M. Inoue || — || align=right | 4.4 km || 
|-id=747 bgcolor=#d6d6d6
| 9747 || 1989 AT || — || January 4, 1989 || Kushiro || S. Ueda, H. Kaneda || — || align=right | 9.2 km || 
|-id=748 bgcolor=#fefefe
| 9748 van Ostaijen ||  ||  || February 4, 1989 || La Silla || E. W. Elst || V || align=right | 3.1 km || 
|-id=749 bgcolor=#fefefe
| 9749 Van den Eijnde ||  ||  || April 3, 1989 || La Silla || E. W. Elst || — || align=right | 3.3 km || 
|-id=750 bgcolor=#E9E9E9
| 9750 ||  || — || July 8, 1989 || Lake Tekapo || A. C. Gilmore, P. M. Kilmartin || — || align=right | 4.0 km || 
|-id=751 bgcolor=#fefefe
| 9751 Kadota || 1990 QM ||  || August 20, 1990 || Geisei || T. Seki || NYS || align=right | 3.6 km || 
|-id=752 bgcolor=#fefefe
| 9752 ||  || — || August 22, 1990 || Palomar || H. E. Holt || — || align=right | 4.3 km || 
|-id=753 bgcolor=#fefefe
| 9753 ||  || — || August 28, 1990 || Palomar || H. E. Holt || V || align=right | 3.4 km || 
|-id=754 bgcolor=#fefefe
| 9754 ||  || — || August 23, 1990 || Palomar || H. E. Holt || NYS || align=right | 2.8 km || 
|-id=755 bgcolor=#fefefe
| 9755 ||  || — || September 15, 1990 || Palomar || H. E. Holt || — || align=right | 6.6 km || 
|-id=756 bgcolor=#E9E9E9
| 9756 Ezaki ||  ||  || February 12, 1991 || Geisei || T. Seki || — || align=right | 5.8 km || 
|-id=757 bgcolor=#d6d6d6
| 9757 Felixdejager ||  ||  || April 8, 1991 || La Silla || E. W. Elst || KOR || align=right | 6.5 km || 
|-id=758 bgcolor=#E9E9E9
| 9758 Dainty ||  ||  || April 13, 1991 || Siding Spring || D. I. Steel || CLO || align=right | 7.7 km || 
|-id=759 bgcolor=#d6d6d6
| 9759 ||  || — || July 12, 1991 || La Silla || H. Debehogne || — || align=right | 13 km || 
|-id=760 bgcolor=#fefefe
| 9760 ||  || — || August 5, 1991 || Palomar || H. E. Holt || — || align=right | 2.6 km || 
|-id=761 bgcolor=#fefefe
| 9761 Krautter ||  ||  || September 13, 1991 || Tautenburg Observatory || L. D. Schmadel, F. Börngen || FLO || align=right | 2.9 km || 
|-id=762 bgcolor=#fefefe
| 9762 Hermannhesse ||  ||  || September 13, 1991 || Tautenburg Observatory || F. Börngen, L. D. Schmadel || — || align=right | 2.3 km || 
|-id=763 bgcolor=#fefefe
| 9763 ||  || — || September 13, 1991 || Palomar || H. E. Holt || — || align=right | 5.1 km || 
|-id=764 bgcolor=#fefefe
| 9764 Morgenstern ||  ||  || October 30, 1991 || Tautenburg Observatory || F. Börngen || — || align=right | 3.4 km || 
|-id=765 bgcolor=#fefefe
| 9765 || 1991 XZ || — || December 14, 1991 || Fujieda || H. Shiozawa, M. Kizawa || — || align=right | 4.3 km || 
|-id=766 bgcolor=#fefefe
| 9766 Bradbury ||  ||  || February 24, 1992 || Kitt Peak || Spacewatch || — || align=right | 5.6 km || 
|-id=767 bgcolor=#B88A00
| 9767 Midsomer Norton ||  ||  || March 10, 1992 || Siding Spring || D. I. Steel || 2:1Junusual || align=right | 3.4 km || 
|-id=768 bgcolor=#fefefe
| 9768 Stephenmaran ||  ||  || April 5, 1992 || Palomar || C. S. Shoemaker, E. M. Shoemaker || PHO || align=right | 4.6 km || 
|-id=769 bgcolor=#fefefe
| 9769 Nautilus ||  ||  || February 24, 1993 || Yakiimo || A. Natori, T. Urata || — || align=right | 2.8 km || 
|-id=770 bgcolor=#fefefe
| 9770 Discovery || 1993 EE ||  || March 1, 1993 || Oohira || T. Urata || — || align=right | 7.0 km || 
|-id=771 bgcolor=#fefefe
| 9771 ||  || — || March 17, 1993 || La Silla || UESAC || FLO || align=right | 3.1 km || 
|-id=772 bgcolor=#E9E9E9
| 9772 || 1993 MB || — || June 16, 1993 || Catalina Station || T. B. Spahr || — || align=right | 7.5 km || 
|-id=773 bgcolor=#FA8072
| 9773 ||  || — || June 23, 1993 || Palomar || E. F. Helin || — || align=right | 4.0 km || 
|-id=774 bgcolor=#E9E9E9
| 9774 Annjudge || 1993 NO ||  || July 12, 1993 || La Silla || E. W. Elst || — || align=right | 3.5 km || 
|-id=775 bgcolor=#E9E9E9
| 9775 Joeferguson ||  ||  || July 19, 1993 || La Silla || E. W. Elst || — || align=right | 3.8 km || 
|-id=776 bgcolor=#d6d6d6
| 9776 ||  || — || November 11, 1993 || Kushiro || S. Ueda, H. Kaneda || KOR || align=right | 7.3 km || 
|-id=777 bgcolor=#fefefe
| 9777 Enterprise || 1994 OB ||  || July 31, 1994 || Nachi-Katsuura || Y. Shimizu, T. Urata || — || align=right | 3.9 km || 
|-id=778 bgcolor=#fefefe
| 9778 Isabelallende ||  ||  || August 12, 1994 || La Silla || E. W. Elst || NYS || align=right | 2.8 km || 
|-id=779 bgcolor=#fefefe
| 9779 ||  || — || September 1, 1994 || Kushiro || S. Ueda, H. Kaneda || — || align=right | 3.4 km || 
|-id=780 bgcolor=#fefefe
| 9780 Bandersnatch || 1994 SB ||  || September 25, 1994 || Nachi-Katsuura || Y. Shimizu, T. Urata || — || align=right | 5.8 km || 
|-id=781 bgcolor=#fefefe
| 9781 Jubjubbird ||  ||  || October 31, 1994 || Nachi-Katsuura || Y. Shimizu, T. Urata || — || align=right | 3.8 km || 
|-id=782 bgcolor=#E9E9E9
| 9782 Edo || 1994 WM ||  || November 25, 1994 || Oizumi || T. Kobayashi || — || align=right | 6.0 km || 
|-id=783 bgcolor=#E9E9E9
| 9783 Tensho-kan ||  ||  || December 28, 1994 || Oizumi || T. Kobayashi || moon || align=right | 5.3 km || 
|-id=784 bgcolor=#E9E9E9
| 9784 Yotsubashi ||  ||  || December 31, 1994 || Oizumi || T. Kobayashi || PAD || align=right | 9.9 km || 
|-id=785 bgcolor=#E9E9E9
| 9785 Senjikan ||  ||  || December 31, 1994 || Oizumi || T. Kobayashi || — || align=right | 5.0 km || 
|-id=786 bgcolor=#d6d6d6
| 9786 Gakutensoku || 1995 BB ||  || January 19, 1995 || Oizumi || T. Kobayashi || KOR || align=right | 5.6 km || 
|-id=787 bgcolor=#E9E9E9
| 9787 ||  || — || January 27, 1995 || Kushiro || S. Ueda, H. Kaneda || — || align=right | 5.3 km || 
|-id=788 bgcolor=#d6d6d6
| 9788 Yagami ||  ||  || March 11, 1995 || Oizumi || T. Kobayashi || — || align=right | 10 km || 
|-id=789 bgcolor=#d6d6d6
| 9789 ||  || — || April 4, 1995 || Kushiro || S. Ueda, H. Kaneda || THM || align=right | 17 km || 
|-id=790 bgcolor=#C2FFFF
| 9790 Deipyrus ||  ||  || July 25, 1995 || Kitt Peak || Spacewatch || L4 || align=right | 33 km || 
|-id=791 bgcolor=#fefefe
| 9791 Kamiyakurai ||  ||  || December 21, 1995 || Oizumi || T. Kobayashi || — || align=right | 3.8 km || 
|-id=792 bgcolor=#fefefe
| 9792 Nonodakesan ||  ||  || January 23, 1996 || Oizumi || T. Kobayashi || KLI || align=right | 8.3 km || 
|-id=793 bgcolor=#fefefe
| 9793 Torvalds ||  ||  || January 16, 1996 || Kitt Peak || Spacewatch || — || align=right | 4.6 km || 
|-id=794 bgcolor=#fefefe
| 9794 ||  || — || March 25, 1996 || Xinglong || SCAP || — || align=right | 4.9 km || 
|-id=795 bgcolor=#d6d6d6
| 9795 Deprez ||  ||  || April 15, 1996 || La Silla || E. W. Elst || KOR || align=right | 4.0 km || 
|-id=796 bgcolor=#E9E9E9
| 9796 Robotti || 1996 HW ||  || April 19, 1996 || Sormano || F. Manca, P. Chiavenna || — || align=right | 5.8 km || 
|-id=797 bgcolor=#d6d6d6
| 9797 Raes ||  ||  || April 18, 1996 || La Silla || E. W. Elst || THM || align=right | 12 km || 
|-id=798 bgcolor=#d6d6d6
| 9798 || 1996 JK || — || May 8, 1996 || Kushiro || S. Ueda, H. Kaneda || EOS || align=right | 13 km || 
|-id=799 bgcolor=#C2FFFF
| 9799 Thronium || 1996 RJ ||  || September 8, 1996 || Catalina Station || T. B. Spahr || L4006 || align=right | 68 km || 
|-id=800 bgcolor=#fefefe
| 9800 Shigetoshi ||  ||  || March 4, 1997 || Oizumi || T. Kobayashi || NYS || align=right | 4.2 km || 
|}

9801–9900 

|-bgcolor=#E9E9E9
| 9801 ||  || — || March 31, 1997 || Socorro || LINEAR || — || align=right | 4.7 km || 
|-id=802 bgcolor=#E9E9E9
| 9802 ||  || — || April 2, 1997 || Socorro || LINEAR || — || align=right | 4.1 km || 
|-id=803 bgcolor=#fefefe
| 9803 ||  || — || April 2, 1997 || Socorro || LINEAR || — || align=right | 4.3 km || 
|-id=804 bgcolor=#E9E9E9
| 9804 Shrikulkarni || 1997 NU ||  || July 1, 1997 || Wise || E. O. Ofek || EUN || align=right | 6.1 km || 
|-id=805 bgcolor=#E9E9E9
| 9805 || 1997 NZ || — || July 1, 1997 || Xinglong || SCAP || EUN || align=right | 8.7 km || 
|-id=806 bgcolor=#d6d6d6
| 9806 ||  || — || July 10, 1997 || Xinglong || SCAP || EOS || align=right | 10 km || 
|-id=807 bgcolor=#C2FFFF
| 9807 Rhene ||  ||  || September 27, 1997 || Oizumi || T. Kobayashi || L4slow || align=right | 25 km || 
|-id=808 bgcolor=#E9E9E9
| 9808 ||  || — || August 24, 1998 || Socorro || LINEAR || EUN || align=right | 4.3 km || 
|-id=809 bgcolor=#E9E9E9
| 9809 Jimdarwin ||  ||  || September 13, 1998 || Anderson Mesa || LONEOS || — || align=right | 3.8 km || 
|-id=810 bgcolor=#fefefe
| 9810 Elanfiller ||  ||  || September 14, 1998 || Socorro || LINEAR || FLO || align=right | 4.1 km || 
|-id=811 bgcolor=#fefefe
| 9811 Cavadore || 1998 ST ||  || September 16, 1998 || Caussols || ODAS || — || align=right | 2.2 km || 
|-id=812 bgcolor=#fefefe
| 9812 Danco ||  ||  || September 18, 1998 || La Silla || E. W. Elst || — || align=right | 4.1 km || 
|-id=813 bgcolor=#fefefe
| 9813 Rozgaj ||  ||  || October 13, 1998 || Višnjan Observatory || K. Korlević || — || align=right | 3.8 km || 
|-id=814 bgcolor=#fefefe
| 9814 Ivobenko ||  ||  || October 23, 1998 || Višnjan Observatory || K. Korlević || — || align=right | 2.2 km || 
|-id=815 bgcolor=#E9E9E9
| 9815 Mariakirch || 2079 P-L ||  || September 24, 1960 || Palomar || PLS || — || align=right | 4.5 km || 
|-id=816 bgcolor=#E9E9E9
| 9816 von Matt || 2643 P-L ||  || September 24, 1960 || Palomar || PLS || HNS || align=right | 3.9 km || 
|-id=817 bgcolor=#C2FFFF
| 9817 Thersander || 6540 P-L ||  || September 24, 1960 || Palomar || PLS || L4 || align=right | 23 km || 
|-id=818 bgcolor=#C2FFFF
| 9818 Eurymachos || 6591 P-L ||  || September 24, 1960 || Palomar || PLS || L4ERY || align=right | 28 km || 
|-id=819 bgcolor=#fefefe
| 9819 Sangerhausen || 2172 T-1 ||  || March 25, 1971 || Palomar || PLS || — || align=right | 2.7 km || 
|-id=820 bgcolor=#fefefe
| 9820 Hempel || 3064 T-1 ||  || March 26, 1971 || Palomar || PLS || — || align=right | 2.3 km || 
|-id=821 bgcolor=#fefefe
| 9821 Gitakresáková || 4033 T-1 ||  || March 26, 1971 || Palomar || PLS || — || align=right | 2.7 km || 
|-id=822 bgcolor=#fefefe
| 9822 Hajduková || 4114 T-1 ||  || March 26, 1971 || Palomar || PLS || NYS || align=right | 3.0 km || 
|-id=823 bgcolor=#fefefe
| 9823 Annantalová || 4271 T-1 ||  || March 26, 1971 || Palomar || PLS || V || align=right | 2.7 km || 
|-id=824 bgcolor=#d6d6d6
| 9824 Marylea || 3033 T-2 ||  || September 30, 1973 || Palomar || PLS || KOR || align=right | 5.5 km || 
|-id=825 bgcolor=#d6d6d6
| 9825 Oetken || 1214 T-3 ||  || October 17, 1977 || Palomar || PLS || EOS || align=right | 9.7 km || 
|-id=826 bgcolor=#d6d6d6
| 9826 Ehrenfreund || 2114 T-3 ||  || October 16, 1977 || Palomar || PLS || EOS || align=right | 8.4 km || 
|-id=827 bgcolor=#d6d6d6
| 9827 ||  || — || October 8, 1958 || Flagstaff || Lowell Obs. || — || align=right | 20 km || 
|-id=828 bgcolor=#C2FFFF
| 9828 Antimachos || 1973 SS ||  || September 19, 1973 || Palomar || PLS || L4 || align=right | 20 km || 
|-id=829 bgcolor=#d6d6d6
| 9829 Murillo ||  ||  || September 19, 1973 || Palomar || PLS || SHU3:2 || align=right | 26 km || 
|-id=830 bgcolor=#fefefe
| 9830 Franciswasiak ||  ||  || November 7, 1978 || Palomar || E. F. Helin, S. J. Bus || — || align=right | 2.5 km || 
|-id=831 bgcolor=#fefefe
| 9831 Simongreen || 1979 QZ ||  || August 22, 1979 || La Silla || C.-I. Lagerkvist || NYS || align=right | 2.3 km || 
|-id=832 bgcolor=#fefefe
| 9832 Xiaobinwang ||  ||  || March 2, 1981 || Siding Spring || S. J. Bus || — || align=right | 2.2 km || 
|-id=833 bgcolor=#fefefe
| 9833 Rilke ||  ||  || February 21, 1982 || Tautenburg Observatory || F. Börngen || FLO || align=right | 3.2 km || 
|-id=834 bgcolor=#d6d6d6
| 9834 Kirsanov ||  ||  || October 14, 1982 || Nauchnij || L. G. Karachkina || EOS || align=right | 12 km || 
|-id=835 bgcolor=#E9E9E9
| 9835 || 1984 UD || — || October 17, 1984 || Kleť || Z. Vávrová || — || align=right | 11 km || 
|-id=836 bgcolor=#E9E9E9
| 9836 Aarseth || 1985 TU ||  || October 15, 1985 || Anderson Mesa || E. Bowell || MIS || align=right | 7.0 km || 
|-id=837 bgcolor=#E9E9E9
| 9837 Jerryhorow ||  ||  || January 12, 1986 || Anderson Mesa || I. Horowitz || — || align=right | 11 km || 
|-id=838 bgcolor=#d6d6d6
| 9838 Falz-Fein ||  ||  || September 4, 1987 || Nauchnij || L. V. Zhuravleva || — || align=right | 13 km || 
|-id=839 bgcolor=#fefefe
| 9839 Crabbegat ||  ||  || February 11, 1988 || La Silla || E. W. Elst || — || align=right | 4.5 km || 
|-id=840 bgcolor=#E9E9E9
| 9840 ||  || — || September 8, 1988 || Brorfelde || P. Jensen || — || align=right | 13 km || 
|-id=841 bgcolor=#fefefe
| 9841 Mašek || 1988 UT ||  || October 18, 1988 || Kleť || Z. Vávrová || — || align=right | 2.7 km || 
|-id=842 bgcolor=#fefefe
| 9842 Funakoshi ||  ||  || January 15, 1989 || Kitami || K. Endate, K. Watanabe || — || align=right | 3.6 km || 
|-id=843 bgcolor=#fefefe
| 9843 Braidwood ||  ||  || January 4, 1989 || Siding Spring || R. H. McNaught || FLO || align=right | 3.5 km || 
|-id=844 bgcolor=#E9E9E9
| 9844 Otani ||  ||  || November 23, 1989 || Yatsugatake || Y. Kushida, O. Muramatsu || — || align=right | 6.7 km || 
|-id=845 bgcolor=#E9E9E9
| 9845 Okamuraosamu ||  ||  || March 27, 1990 || Kitami || K. Endate, K. Watanabe || — || align=right | 11 km || 
|-id=846 bgcolor=#fefefe
| 9846 ||  || — || July 29, 1990 || Palomar || H. E. Holt || — || align=right | 4.6 km || 
|-id=847 bgcolor=#fefefe
| 9847 ||  || — || August 25, 1990 || Palomar || H. E. Holt || NYS || align=right | 3.1 km || 
|-id=848 bgcolor=#fefefe
| 9848 Yugra ||  ||  || August 26, 1990 || Nauchnij || L. V. Zhuravleva || NYS || align=right | 4.2 km || 
|-id=849 bgcolor=#fefefe
| 9849 ||  || — || September 14, 1990 || Palomar || H. E. Holt || NYS || align=right | 4.9 km || 
|-id=850 bgcolor=#fefefe
| 9850 Ralphcopeland ||  ||  || October 9, 1990 || Siding Spring || R. H. McNaught || V || align=right | 3.2 km || 
|-id=851 bgcolor=#E9E9E9
| 9851 Sakamoto ||  ||  || October 24, 1990 || Kitami || K. Endate, K. Watanabe || — || align=right | 5.3 km || 
|-id=852 bgcolor=#E9E9E9
| 9852 Gora || 1990 YX ||  || December 24, 1990 || Geisei || T. Seki || — || align=right | 3.7 km || 
|-id=853 bgcolor=#E9E9E9
| 9853 l'Épée ||  ||  || January 7, 1991 || Siding Spring || R. H. McNaught || — || align=right | 12 km || 
|-id=854 bgcolor=#E9E9E9
| 9854 Karlheinz ||  ||  || January 15, 1991 || Tautenburg Observatory || F. Börngen || — || align=right | 5.2 km || 
|-id=855 bgcolor=#E9E9E9
| 9855 Thomasdick || 1991 CU ||  || February 7, 1991 || Siding Spring || R. H. McNaught || — || align=right | 6.4 km || 
|-id=856 bgcolor=#FFC2E0
| 9856 || 1991 EE || — || March 13, 1991 || Kitt Peak || Spacewatch || APO +1kmPHA || align=right | 1.0 km || 
|-id=857 bgcolor=#C2FFFF
| 9857 Hecamede || 1991 EN ||  || March 10, 1991 || Siding Spring || R. H. McNaught || L4 || align=right | 50 km || 
|-id=858 bgcolor=#d6d6d6
| 9858 ||  || — || July 18, 1991 || La Silla || H. Debehogne || THM || align=right | 12 km || 
|-id=859 bgcolor=#d6d6d6
| 9859 Van Lierde ||  ||  || August 3, 1991 || La Silla || E. W. Elst || KOR || align=right | 9.4 km || 
|-id=860 bgcolor=#d6d6d6
| 9860 Archaeopteryx ||  ||  || August 6, 1991 || La Silla || E. W. Elst || VER || align=right | 12 km || 
|-id=861 bgcolor=#fefefe
| 9861 Jahreiss ||  ||  || September 9, 1991 || Tautenburg Observatory || L. D. Schmadel, F. Börngen || — || align=right | 2.9 km || 
|-id=862 bgcolor=#fefefe
| 9862 ||  || — || September 13, 1991 || Palomar || H. E. Holt || — || align=right | 4.4 km || 
|-id=863 bgcolor=#fefefe
| 9863 Reichardt ||  ||  || September 13, 1991 || Tautenburg Observatory || F. Börngen, L. D. Schmadel || FLO || align=right | 3.8 km || 
|-id=864 bgcolor=#d6d6d6
| 9864 ||  || — || September 13, 1991 || Palomar || H. E. Holt || — || align=right | 13 km || 
|-id=865 bgcolor=#fefefe
| 9865 Akiraohta ||  ||  || October 3, 1991 || Toyota || K. Suzuki, T. Urata || FLO || align=right | 3.3 km || 
|-id=866 bgcolor=#fefefe
| 9866 Kanaimitsuo ||  ||  || October 15, 1991 || Kiyosato || S. Otomo || — || align=right | 3.5 km || 
|-id=867 bgcolor=#fefefe
| 9867 || 1991 VM || — || November 3, 1991 || Yakiimo || A. Natori, T. Urata || — || align=right | 4.5 km || 
|-id=868 bgcolor=#fefefe
| 9868 ||  || — || November 4, 1991 || Kushiro || S. Ueda, H. Kaneda || FLO || align=right | 3.5 km || 
|-id=869 bgcolor=#fefefe
| 9869 Yadoumaru ||  ||  || February 9, 1992 || Kitami || K. Endate, K. Watanabe || NYS || align=right | 5.5 km || 
|-id=870 bgcolor=#fefefe
| 9870 Maehata || 1992 DA ||  || February 24, 1992 || Geisei || T. Seki || — || align=right | 4.1 km || 
|-id=871 bgcolor=#fefefe
| 9871 Jeon ||  ||  || February 28, 1992 || Kitami || T. Fujii, K. Watanabe || — || align=right | 3.8 km || 
|-id=872 bgcolor=#fefefe
| 9872 Solf ||  ||  || February 27, 1992 || Tautenburg Observatory || F. Börngen || V || align=right | 3.0 km || 
|-id=873 bgcolor=#fefefe
| 9873 Freundlich || 1992 GH ||  || April 9, 1992 || Siding Spring || R. H. McNaught || H || align=right | 5.4 km || 
|-id=874 bgcolor=#fefefe
| 9874 ||  || — || March 21, 1993 || La Silla || UESAC || — || align=right | 3.1 km || 
|-id=875 bgcolor=#fefefe
| 9875 ||  || — || March 21, 1993 || La Silla || UESAC || — || align=right | 5.4 km || 
|-id=876 bgcolor=#fefefe
| 9876 ||  || — || March 19, 1993 || La Silla || UESAC || — || align=right | 2.9 km || 
|-id=877 bgcolor=#E9E9E9
| 9877 ||  || — || September 18, 1993 || Palomar || H. E. Holt || — || align=right | 8.3 km || 
|-id=878 bgcolor=#d6d6d6
| 9878 Sostero || 1994 FQ ||  || March 17, 1994 || Farra d'Isonzo || Farra d'Isonzo || — || align=right | 8.1 km || 
|-id=879 bgcolor=#fefefe
| 9879 Mammuthus ||  ||  || August 12, 1994 || La Silla || E. W. Elst || ERI || align=right | 4.7 km || 
|-id=880 bgcolor=#fefefe
| 9880 Stegosaurus ||  ||  || August 12, 1994 || La Silla || E. W. Elst || FLO || align=right | 2.6 km || 
|-id=881 bgcolor=#FA8072
| 9881 Sampson || 1994 SE ||  || September 25, 1994 || Siding Spring || R. H. McNaught || — || align=right | 2.0 km || 
|-id=882 bgcolor=#fefefe
| 9882 Stallman ||  ||  || September 28, 1994 || Kitt Peak || Spacewatch || — || align=right | 4.2 km || 
|-id=883 bgcolor=#fefefe
| 9883 Veecas ||  ||  || October 8, 1994 || Camarillo Obs. || J. E. Rogers || V || align=right | 2.3 km || 
|-id=884 bgcolor=#fefefe
| 9884 Příbram ||  ||  || October 12, 1994 || Kleť || M. Tichý, Z. Moravec || MAS || align=right | 4.7 km || 
|-id=885 bgcolor=#fefefe
| 9885 Linux ||  ||  || October 12, 1994 || Kitt Peak || Spacewatch || V || align=right | 4.6 km || 
|-id=886 bgcolor=#fefefe
| 9886 Aoyagi ||  ||  || November 8, 1994 || Kiyosato || S. Otomo || NYS || align=right | 3.1 km || 
|-id=887 bgcolor=#E9E9E9
| 9887 Ashikaga || 1995 AH ||  || January 2, 1995 || Oizumi || T. Kobayashi || — || align=right | 3.7 km || 
|-id=888 bgcolor=#E9E9E9
| 9888 || 1995 CD || — || February 1, 1995 || Oizumi || T. Kobayashi || — || align=right | 7.0 km || 
|-id=889 bgcolor=#d6d6d6
| 9889 ||  || — || March 28, 1995 || Kushiro || S. Ueda, H. Kaneda || KOR || align=right | 6.6 km || 
|-id=890 bgcolor=#fefefe
| 9890 ||  || — || September 20, 1995 || Kushiro || S. Ueda, H. Kaneda || — || align=right | 3.1 km || 
|-id=891 bgcolor=#E9E9E9
| 9891 Stephensmith ||  ||  || December 15, 1995 || Oizumi || T. Kobayashi || EUN || align=right | 7.7 km || 
|-id=892 bgcolor=#fefefe
| 9892 Meigetsuki ||  ||  || December 27, 1995 || Oizumi || T. Kobayashi || — || align=right | 3.6 km || 
|-id=893 bgcolor=#fefefe
| 9893 Sagano ||  ||  || January 12, 1996 || Oizumi || T. Kobayashi || — || align=right | 3.4 km || 
|-id=894 bgcolor=#fefefe
| 9894 ||  || — || January 23, 1996 || Oizumi || T. Kobayashi || — || align=right | 4.5 km || 
|-id=895 bgcolor=#fefefe
| 9895 ||  || — || January 27, 1996 || Oizumi || T. Kobayashi || FLO || align=right | 4.5 km || 
|-id=896 bgcolor=#fefefe
| 9896 ||  || — || January 22, 1996 || Socorro || Lincoln Lab ETS || FLO || align=right | 4.7 km || 
|-id=897 bgcolor=#fefefe
| 9897 Malerba ||  ||  || February 14, 1996 || Asiago || M. Tombelli, U. Munari || FLO || align=right | 3.1 km || 
|-id=898 bgcolor=#fefefe
| 9898 Yoshiro || 1996 DF ||  || February 18, 1996 || Oizumi || T. Kobayashi || — || align=right | 5.3 km || 
|-id=899 bgcolor=#fefefe
| 9899 Greaves || 1996 EH ||  || March 12, 1996 || Siding Spring || R. H. McNaught || — || align=right | 5.0 km || 
|-id=900 bgcolor=#fefefe
| 9900 Llull ||  ||  || June 13, 1997 || Majorca || M. Blasco || slow || align=right | 3.7 km || 
|}

9901–10000 

|-bgcolor=#fefefe
| 9901 || 1997 NV || — || July 1, 1997 || Kleť || Kleť Obs. || V || align=right | 3.0 km || 
|-id=902 bgcolor=#fefefe
| 9902 Kirkpatrick || 1997 NY ||  || July 3, 1997 || Prescott || P. G. Comba || FLO || align=right | 3.6 km || 
|-id=903 bgcolor=#d6d6d6
| 9903 Leonhardt ||  ||  || July 4, 1997 || Prescott || P. G. Comba || — || align=right | 8.5 km || 
|-id=904 bgcolor=#E9E9E9
| 9904 Mauratombelli ||  ||  || July 29, 1997 || San Marcello || A. Boattini, L. Tesi || — || align=right | 7.6 km || 
|-id=905 bgcolor=#fefefe
| 9905 Tiziano || 4611 P-L ||  || September 24, 1960 || Palomar || PLS || — || align=right | 5.2 km || 
|-id=906 bgcolor=#E9E9E9
| 9906 Tintoretto || 6523 P-L ||  || September 26, 1960 || Palomar || PLS || EUN || align=right | 6.5 km || 
|-id=907 bgcolor=#C2FFFF
| 9907 Oileus || 6541 P-L ||  || September 24, 1960 || Palomar || PLS || L4 || align=right | 26 km || 
|-id=908 bgcolor=#d6d6d6
| 9908 Aue || 2140 T-1 ||  || March 25, 1971 || Palomar || PLS || KOR || align=right | 7.2 km || 
|-id=909 bgcolor=#fefefe
| 9909 Eschenbach || 4355 T-1 ||  || March 26, 1971 || Palomar || PLS || FLO || align=right | 3.4 km || 
|-id=910 bgcolor=#d6d6d6
| 9910 Vogelweide || 3181 T-2 ||  || September 30, 1973 || Palomar || PLS || slow || align=right | 6.0 km || 
|-id=911 bgcolor=#fefefe
| 9911 Quantz || 4129 T-2 ||  || September 29, 1973 || Palomar || PLS || — || align=right | 3.2 km || 
|-id=912 bgcolor=#E9E9E9
| 9912 Donizetti || 2078 T-3 ||  || October 16, 1977 || Palomar || PLS || RAF || align=right | 6.9 km || 
|-id=913 bgcolor=#fefefe
| 9913 Humperdinck || 4071 T-3 ||  || October 16, 1977 || Palomar || PLS || — || align=right | 6.0 km || 
|-id=914 bgcolor=#E9E9E9
| 9914 Obukhova ||  ||  || October 28, 1976 || Nauchnij || L. V. Zhuravleva || MIS || align=right | 8.6 km || 
|-id=915 bgcolor=#d6d6d6
| 9915 Potanin ||  ||  || September 8, 1977 || Nauchnij || N. S. Chernykh || — || align=right | 12 km || 
|-id=916 bgcolor=#d6d6d6
| 9916 Kibirev ||  ||  || October 3, 1978 || Nauchnij || N. S. Chernykh || KOR || align=right | 6.2 km || 
|-id=917 bgcolor=#fefefe
| 9917 Keynes || 1979 MK ||  || June 26, 1979 || Cerro El Roble || C. Torres || V || align=right | 4.1 km || 
|-id=918 bgcolor=#d6d6d6
| 9918 Timtrenkle ||  ||  || June 25, 1979 || Siding Spring || E. F. Helin, S. J. Bus || HYG || align=right | 11 km || 
|-id=919 bgcolor=#fefefe
| 9919 Undset ||  ||  || August 22, 1979 || La Silla || C.-I. Lagerkvist || NYS || align=right | 2.5 km || 
|-id=920 bgcolor=#E9E9E9
| 9920 Bagnulo ||  ||  || March 1, 1981 || Siding Spring || S. J. Bus || HOF || align=right | 13 km || 
|-id=921 bgcolor=#fefefe
| 9921 Rubincam ||  ||  || March 2, 1981 || Siding Spring || S. J. Bus || — || align=right | 4.3 km || 
|-id=922 bgcolor=#fefefe
| 9922 Catcheller ||  ||  || March 2, 1981 || Siding Spring || S. J. Bus || NYS || align=right | 2.6 km || 
|-id=923 bgcolor=#E9E9E9
| 9923 Ronaldthiel ||  ||  || March 7, 1981 || Siding Spring || S. J. Bus || — || align=right | 4.1 km || 
|-id=924 bgcolor=#E9E9E9
| 9924 Corrigan ||  ||  || March 2, 1981 || Siding Spring || S. J. Bus || AGN || align=right | 4.6 km || 
|-id=925 bgcolor=#E9E9E9
| 9925 Juliehoskin ||  ||  || March 2, 1981 || Siding Spring || S. J. Bus || — || align=right | 4.9 km || 
|-id=926 bgcolor=#fefefe
| 9926 Desch ||  ||  || March 2, 1981 || Siding Spring || S. J. Bus || NYS || align=right | 1.9 km || 
|-id=927 bgcolor=#fefefe
| 9927 Tyutchev ||  ||  || October 3, 1981 || Nauchnij || L. G. Karachkina || — || align=right | 2.4 km || 
|-id=928 bgcolor=#fefefe
| 9928 ||  || — || November 16, 1981 || Bickley || Perth Obs. || — || align=right | 2.4 km || 
|-id=929 bgcolor=#fefefe
| 9929 McConnell ||  ||  || February 24, 1982 || Harvard Observatory || Oak Ridge Observatory || FLO || align=right | 3.5 km || 
|-id=930 bgcolor=#fefefe
| 9930 Billburrows || 1984 CP ||  || February 5, 1984 || Anderson Mesa || E. Bowell || — || align=right | 7.8 km || 
|-id=931 bgcolor=#fefefe
| 9931 Herbhauptman || 1985 HH ||  || April 18, 1985 || Kleť || A. Mrkos || NYS || align=right | 5.2 km || 
|-id=932 bgcolor=#E9E9E9
| 9932 Kopylov ||  ||  || August 23, 1985 || Nauchnij || N. S. Chernykh || — || align=right | 6.0 km || 
|-id=933 bgcolor=#fefefe
| 9933 Alekseev ||  ||  || September 19, 1985 || Nauchnij || N. S. Chernykh, L. I. Chernykh || — || align=right | 3.5 km || 
|-id=934 bgcolor=#E9E9E9
| 9934 Caccioppoli || 1985 UC ||  || October 20, 1985 || Anderson Mesa || E. Bowell || GER || align=right | 7.7 km || 
|-id=935 bgcolor=#E9E9E9
| 9935 ||  || — || February 4, 1986 || La Silla || H. Debehogne || — || align=right | 11 km || 
|-id=936 bgcolor=#d6d6d6
| 9936 Al-Biruni ||  ||  || August 8, 1986 || Smolyan || E. W. Elst, V. G. Ivanova || — || align=right | 24 km || 
|-id=937 bgcolor=#fefefe
| 9937 Triceratops ||  ||  || February 17, 1988 || La Silla || E. W. Elst || NYS || align=right | 2.5 km || 
|-id=938 bgcolor=#fefefe
| 9938 Kretlow || 1988 KA ||  || May 18, 1988 || La Silla || W. Landgraf || — || align=right | 3.7 km || 
|-id=939 bgcolor=#fefefe
| 9939 || 1988 VK || — || November 3, 1988 || Chiyoda || T. Kojima || — || align=right | 3.9 km || 
|-id=940 bgcolor=#fefefe
| 9940 ||  || — || November 11, 1988 || Gekko || Y. Oshima || — || align=right | 3.1 km || 
|-id=941 bgcolor=#fefefe
| 9941 Iguanodon ||  ||  || February 4, 1989 || La Silla || E. W. Elst || FLO || align=right | 3.1 km || 
|-id=942 bgcolor=#E9E9E9
| 9942 ||  || — || October 8, 1989 || Okutama || T. Hioki, N. Kawasato || — || align=right | 4.1 km || 
|-id=943 bgcolor=#E9E9E9
| 9943 Bizan ||  ||  || October 29, 1989 || Tokushima || M. Iwamoto, T. Furuta || — || align=right | 5.5 km || 
|-id=944 bgcolor=#d6d6d6
| 9944 ||  || — || February 24, 1990 || La Silla || H. Debehogne || KOR || align=right | 5.4 km || 
|-id=945 bgcolor=#fefefe
| 9945 Karinaxavier || 1990 KX ||  || May 21, 1990 || Palomar || E. F. Helin || FLO || align=right | 4.4 km || 
|-id=946 bgcolor=#fefefe
| 9946 ||  || — || July 29, 1990 || Palomar || H. E. Holt || — || align=right | 2.7 km || 
|-id=947 bgcolor=#fefefe
| 9947 Takaishuji || 1990 QB ||  || August 17, 1990 || Palomar || E. F. Helin || PHO || align=right | 3.4 km || 
|-id=948 bgcolor=#fefefe
| 9948 ||  || — || August 22, 1990 || Palomar || H. E. Holt || NYS || align=right | 3.3 km || 
|-id=949 bgcolor=#fefefe
| 9949 Brontosaurus ||  ||  || September 22, 1990 || La Silla || E. W. Elst || V || align=right | 4.4 km || 
|-id=950 bgcolor=#FFC2E0
| 9950 ESA || 1990 VB ||  || November 8, 1990 || Caussols || C. Pollas || AMO +1km || align=right | 2.1 km || 
|-id=951 bgcolor=#fefefe
| 9951 Tyrannosaurus ||  ||  || November 15, 1990 || La Silla || E. W. Elst || V || align=right | 3.1 km || 
|-id=952 bgcolor=#E9E9E9
| 9952 || 1991 AK || — || January 9, 1991 || Yorii || M. Arai, H. Mori || — || align=right | 7.3 km || 
|-id=953 bgcolor=#E9E9E9
| 9953 || 1991 EB || — || March 7, 1991 || Kushiro || S. Ueda, H. Kaneda || — || align=right | 5.3 km || 
|-id=954 bgcolor=#E9E9E9
| 9954 Brachiosaurus ||  ||  || April 8, 1991 || La Silla || E. W. Elst || — || align=right | 11 km || 
|-id=955 bgcolor=#fefefe
| 9955 ||  || — || August 7, 1991 || Palomar || H. E. Holt || FLO || align=right | 5.7 km || 
|-id=956 bgcolor=#fefefe
| 9956 Castellaz ||  ||  || October 5, 1991 || Tautenburg Observatory || L. D. Schmadel, F. Börngen || — || align=right | 3.8 km || 
|-id=957 bgcolor=#fefefe
| 9957 Raffaellosanti ||  ||  || October 6, 1991 || Tautenburg Observatory || F. Börngen || — || align=right | 5.2 km || 
|-id=958 bgcolor=#fefefe
| 9958 ||  || — || November 4, 1991 || Kushiro || S. Ueda, H. Kaneda || — || align=right | 3.8 km || 
|-id=959 bgcolor=#fefefe
| 9959 ||  || — || November 9, 1991 || Kushiro || S. Ueda, H. Kaneda || — || align=right | 3.6 km || 
|-id=960 bgcolor=#fefefe
| 9960 Sekine ||  ||  || November 4, 1991 || Kiyosato || S. Otomo || FLO || align=right | 3.2 km || 
|-id=961 bgcolor=#fefefe
| 9961 || 1991 XK || — || December 4, 1991 || Kushiro || S. Ueda, H. Kaneda || FLO || align=right | 3.4 km || 
|-id=962 bgcolor=#fefefe
| 9962 Pfau ||  ||  || December 28, 1991 || Tautenburg Observatory || F. Börngen || — || align=right | 3.1 km || 
|-id=963 bgcolor=#fefefe
| 9963 Sandage || 1992 AN ||  || January 9, 1992 || Palomar || E. F. Helin || PHO || align=right | 6.4 km || 
|-id=964 bgcolor=#fefefe
| 9964 Hideyonoguchi ||  ||  || February 13, 1992 || Geisei || T. Seki || — || align=right | 5.9 km || 
|-id=965 bgcolor=#fefefe
| 9965 GNU ||  ||  || March 5, 1992 || Kitt Peak || Spacewatch || — || align=right | 6.3 km || 
|-id=966 bgcolor=#fefefe
| 9966 ||  || — || March 2, 1992 || La Silla || UESAC || NYS || align=right | 5.0 km || 
|-id=967 bgcolor=#E9E9E9
| 9967 Awanoyumi ||  ||  || March 31, 1992 || Kitami || K. Endate, K. Watanabe || — || align=right | 7.6 km || 
|-id=968 bgcolor=#E9E9E9
| 9968 Serpe ||  ||  || May 4, 1992 || La Silla || H. Debehogne || — || align=right | 12 km || 
|-id=969 bgcolor=#FA8072
| 9969 Braille || 1992 KD ||  || May 27, 1992 || Palomar || E. F. Helin, K. J. Lawrence || slow || align=right | 1.9 km || 
|-id=970 bgcolor=#E9E9E9
| 9970 ||  || — || September 26, 1992 || Dynic || A. Sugie || — || align=right | 20 km || 
|-id=971 bgcolor=#fefefe
| 9971 Ishihara || 1993 HS ||  || April 16, 1993 || Kitami || K. Endate, K. Watanabe || — || align=right | 5.0 km || 
|-id=972 bgcolor=#fefefe
| 9972 Minoruoda || 1993 KQ ||  || May 26, 1993 || Kiyosato || S. Otomo || moon || align=right | 8.9 km || 
|-id=973 bgcolor=#E9E9E9
| 9973 Szpilman ||  ||  || July 12, 1993 || La Silla || E. W. Elst || — || align=right | 4.0 km || 
|-id=974 bgcolor=#fefefe
| 9974 Brody ||  ||  || July 19, 1993 || La Silla || E. W. Elst || NYS || align=right | 3.9 km || 
|-id=975 bgcolor=#fefefe
| 9975 Takimotokoso ||  ||  || September 12, 1993 || Kitami || K. Endate, K. Watanabe || — || align=right | 5.8 km || 
|-id=976 bgcolor=#E9E9E9
| 9976 || 1993 TQ || — || October 9, 1993 || Hidaka || S. Shirai, S. Hayakawa || — || align=right | 14 km || 
|-id=977 bgcolor=#d6d6d6
| 9977 Kentakunimoto || 1994 AH ||  || January 2, 1994 || Oizumi || T. Kobayashi || KOR || align=right | 8.0 km || 
|-id=978 bgcolor=#d6d6d6
| 9978 ||  || — || January 7, 1994 || Oizumi || T. Kobayashi || EOS || align=right | 8.7 km || 
|-id=979 bgcolor=#fefefe
| 9979 || 1994 VT || — || November 3, 1994 || Oizumi || T. Kobayashi || NYS || align=right | 3.1 km || 
|-id=980 bgcolor=#E9E9E9
| 9980 ||  || — || January 31, 1995 || Oizumi || T. Kobayashi || — || align=right | 5.9 km || 
|-id=981 bgcolor=#E9E9E9
| 9981 Kudo ||  ||  || January 31, 1995 || Oizumi || T. Kobayashi || — || align=right | 5.6 km || 
|-id=982 bgcolor=#E9E9E9
| 9982 || 1995 CH || — || February 1, 1995 || Oizumi || T. Kobayashi || — || align=right | 4.1 km || 
|-id=983 bgcolor=#E9E9E9
| 9983 Rickfienberg || 1995 DA ||  || February 19, 1995 || Sudbury || D. di Cicco || — || align=right | 7.4 km || 
|-id=984 bgcolor=#fefefe
| 9984 Gregbryant || 1996 HT ||  || April 18, 1996 || Macquarie || R. H. McNaught, J. B. Child || — || align=right | 11 km || 
|-id=985 bgcolor=#fefefe
| 9985 Akiko || 1996 JF ||  || May 12, 1996 || Yatsuka || R. H. McNaught, H. Abe || — || align=right | 3.0 km || 
|-id=986 bgcolor=#E9E9E9
| 9986 Hirokun || 1996 NX ||  || July 12, 1996 || Nachi-Katsuura || Y. Shimizu, T. Urata || MAR || align=right | 8.0 km || 
|-id=987 bgcolor=#fefefe
| 9987 Peano ||  ||  || July 29, 1997 || Prescott || P. G. Comba || — || align=right | 2.7 km || 
|-id=988 bgcolor=#d6d6d6
| 9988 Erictemplebell ||  ||  || September 9, 1997 || Prescott || P. G. Comba || KOR || align=right | 7.1 km || 
|-id=989 bgcolor=#d6d6d6
| 9989 ||  || — || September 27, 1997 || Uenohara || N. Kawasato || KOR || align=right | 6.7 km || 
|-id=990 bgcolor=#d6d6d6
| 9990 Niiyaeki ||  ||  || September 30, 1997 || Nanyo || T. Okuni || KOR || align=right | 5.2 km || 
|-id=991 bgcolor=#d6d6d6
| 9991 Anežka ||  ||  || October 5, 1997 || Kleť || Z. Moravec || — || align=right | 12 km || 
|-id=992 bgcolor=#FA8072
| 9992 ||  || — || October 8, 1997 || Gekko || T. Kagawa, T. Urata || — || align=right | 3.4 km || 
|-id=993 bgcolor=#E9E9E9
| 9993 Kumamoto ||  ||  || November 6, 1997 || Kumamoto || J. Kobayashi || — || align=right | 6.4 km || 
|-id=994 bgcolor=#E9E9E9
| 9994 Grotius || 4028 P-L ||  || September 24, 1960 || Palomar || PLS || RAF || align=right | 3.7 km || 
|-id=995 bgcolor=#fefefe
| 9995 Alouette || 4805 P-L ||  || September 24, 1960 || Palomar || PLS || NYS || align=right | 2.6 km || 
|-id=996 bgcolor=#E9E9E9
| 9996 ANS || 9070 P-L ||  || October 17, 1960 || Palomar || PLS || DOR || align=right | 9.0 km || 
|-id=997 bgcolor=#E9E9E9
| 9997 COBE || 1217 T-1 ||  || March 25, 1971 || Palomar || PLS || — || align=right | 4.1 km || 
|-id=998 bgcolor=#fefefe
| 9998 ISO || 1293 T-1 ||  || March 25, 1971 || Palomar || PLS || — || align=right | 2.2 km || 
|-id=999 bgcolor=#d6d6d6
| 9999 Wiles || 4196 T-2 ||  || September 29, 1973 || Palomar || PLS || KOR || align=right | 7.1 km || 
|-id=000 bgcolor=#E9E9E9
| 10000 Myriostos || 1951 SY ||  || September 30, 1951 || Palomar || A. G. Wilson || — || align=right | 2.7 km || 
|}

References

External links 
 Discovery Circumstances: Numbered Minor Planets (5001)–(10000) (IAU Minor Planet Center)

0009